= Transderivational search =

Term in psychology and cybernetics

Transderivational search (often abbreviated to TDS) is a psychological and cybernetics term, meaning when a search is being conducted for a fuzzy match across a broad field. In computing the equivalent function can be performed using content-addressable memory.

Unlike usual searches, which look for literal (i.e. exact, logical, or regular expression) matches, a transderivational search is a search for a possible meaning or possible match as part of communication, and without which an incoming communication cannot be made any sense of whatsoever. It is thus an integral part of processing language, and of attaching meaning to communication.

In NLP (Neuro-linguistic programming), a transderivational search (Bandler and Grinder, 1976) is essentially the process of searching back through one's stored memories and mental representations to find the personal reference experiences from which a current understanding or mental map has been derived.

By the end of 1976, Grinder and Bandler had combined Satir’s and Perls’ language patterns and Erickson’s hypnotic language and use of metaphor with anchoring to create new processes that they called collapsing anchors, trans-derivational search, changing personal history, and reframing.

A psychological example of TDS is in Ericksonian hypnotherapy, where vague suggestions are used that the patient must process intensely in order to find their own meanings, thus ensuring that the practitioner does not intrude his own beliefs into the subject's inner world.

== TDS in human communication and processing ==
Because TDS is a compelling, automatic and unconscious state of internal focus and processing (i.e. a type of everyday trance state), and often a state of internal lack of certainty, or openness to finding an answer (since something is being checked out at that moment), it can be utilized or interrupted, in order to create, or deepen, trance.

TDS is a fundamental part of human language and cognitive processing. Arguably, every word or utterance a person hears, for example, and everything they see or feel and take note of, results in a very brief trance while TDS is carried out to establish a contextual meaning for it.

=== Examples ===
Leading statements:

- "And those thoughts you had yesterday..." the human mind cannot process hearing this phrase, without at some level searching internally for some thoughts or other that it had yesterday, to make the subject of the sentence.
- "The many colors that fruit can be" likewise starts the human mind considering even if briefly, different fruit sorted by color.
- "You did it again, didn't you!" This everyday manipulative use of TDS usually sends the recipient looking internally for some "it" they may have done for which blame is being fairly given. Regardless of whether such a matter can be identified, guilt or anger may result.
- "There has been pain, hasn't there" the mind of a patient suffering an illness will find it very hard or impossible to hear or answer this sentence without conducting internal searches to verify whether this is true or not, or to find an example if so.
- "You'd forgotten something [or: some part of your body], hadn't you?" the mind usually checks through the various things, or parts of the body, on hearing this, seeing if each in turn has been forgotten.

Textual ambiguity:

- "Do you remember line dancing on the steps?" Without sufficient context, some statements may trigger TDS in order to resolve inherent ambiguity in the interpretation of a posed question. Do I remember a bygone fad called "line dancing on the steps"? Do I remember personally engaging in dancing in the past? Do I remember my routine practice dancing by focusing on the steps of the dance? Do I tend to forget about dancing when I am standing on steps?
- "Penny-wise and pound the table dance to the beat of a different drummer". The mixing of cliché and stock phrases may trigger TDS in order to reconcile the discrepancies between expected and actual utterances in sequence.

Although TDS is often associated with spoken language, it can be induced in any perceptual system. Thus Milton Erickson's "hypnotic handshake" is a technique that leaves the other person performing TDS in search of meaning to a deliberately ambiguous use of touch.

== See also ==
- Ambiguity
- Milton Erickson
- Hypnosis
- Linguistics
- Presupposition
- Artificial intelligence
- Natural language processing
- Information extraction
- Content-addressable memory
- Garden path sentence
