= Apache OpenNLP =

Open-source natural language processing library

- Developer(s): Apache Software Foundation
- Initial release: July 19, 2004; 20 years ago
- Stable release: 2.5.3 / January 10, 2025; 5 months ago
- Repository: OpenNLP Repository
- Written in: Java
- Type: Natural language processing
- License: Apache License 2.0
- Website: opennlp.apache.org

The Apache OpenNLP library is a machine learning based toolkit for the processing of natural language text. It supports the most common NLP tasks, such as language detection, tokenization, sentence segmentation, part-of-speech tagging, named entity extraction, chunking, parsing and coreference resolution. These tasks are usually required to build more advanced text processing services.

== See also ==
- Unstructured Information Management Architecture (UIMA)
- General Architecture for Text Engineering (GATE)
- cTAKES
