= Truecasing =

Truecasing, also called capitalization recovery, capitalization correction, or case restoration, is the problem in natural language processing (NLP) of determining the proper capitalization of words where such information is unavailable. This commonly comes up due to the standard practice (in English and many other languages) of automatically capitalizing the first word of a sentence. It can also arise in badly cased or noncased text (for example, all-lowercase or all-uppercase text messages).

Truecasing is only necessary for orthographies that have casing. This includes most languages written in the Latin, Greek, Cyrillic and Armenian scripts.

== Techniques ==
- Neural networks that operate at the word level or the character level have been trained to recover capitalization with greater than 90% accuracy.
- Sentence segmentation can be used to determine where sentences begin, to implement the rule that the first word of every sentence must be capitalized.
- Part-of-speech tagging can be used to identify proper nouns (such as Africa, Jupiter, Sarah, or Amazon), which must be capitalized. In some cases, the same word can be used as different parts of speech, and is capitalized differently. For example, Xerox the company, as a noun, is capitalized, but to xerox a document, as a verb, is not capitalized. A xerox, as in the copy of a document, can be recognized by the presence of a determiner, which is not used for proper nouns.
- Named entity recognition can be used to identify proper nouns, which must be capitalized.
- A spell checker can be used to identify words that are always capitalized.

== Applications ==
Truecasing aids in other NLP tasks, such as named entity recognition (NER), automatic content extraction (ACE), and machine translation. Proper capitalization allows easier detection of proper nouns, which are the starting points of NER and ACE. Some translation systems use statistical machine learning techniques, which could make use of the information contained in capitalization to increase accuracy.

== See also ==
- Sentence case
- Title case
