= TeLQAS =

TeLQAS (Telecommunication Literature Question Answering System) is an experimental question answering system developed for answering English questions in the telecommunications domain.

== Architecture ==
TeLQAS includes three main subsystems: an online subsystem, an offline subsystem, and an ontology. The online subsystem answers questions submitted by users in real time. During the online process, TeLQAS processes the question using a natural language processing component that implements part-of-speech tagging and simple syntactic parsing. The online subsystem also utilizes an inference engine in order to carry out necessary inference on small elements of knowledge. The offline subsystem automatically indexes documents collected by a focused web crawler from the web. An ontology server along with its API is used for knowledge representation. The main concepts and classes of the ontology are created by domain experts. Some of these classes, however, can be instantiated automatically by the offline components.
