= Reading tutoring =

Supplemental reading practice

Reading tutoring is supplemental reading practice that occurs outside of the school reading curriculum. It usually has some type of consistent structure and can take place at a school, a tutoring center, or at home. The tutor can be a professional, paraprofessional, volunteer, or family member. Reading tutoring can be used for all ages, and is dependent on reading ability and/or level.

== Where tutoring takes place ==
- Tutoring centers. There are tutoring centers specific to reading, reading for students with disabilities, or multiple school subjects.
- Schools. Some schools offer tutoring during or after the school day.
- Home. Tutors may visit a child's home, or family members may tutor children in reading.
- Online. Since the Covid-19 pandemic, tutoring has increasingly shifted to the internet.

== Types of tutors ==
- Professionals: This type of tutor will have a teaching credential, a reading certificate, and/or a reading specialist credential
- Paraprofessionals: This type of tutor may have been trained in certain aspects of reading tutoring, but has not been credentialed, nor do they have certification. See: Paraprofessional educator
- Volunteers: A tutor may be a volunteer that was trained to carry out a reading program.
- Family members: A family member may be considered a tutor when they implement specific tutoring practices with a child during home reading practice.
- Automated: Speech recognition-based pronunciation assessment supports reading instruction in products such as Microsoft Teams and from Amira Learning.

== U.S. legislation that impacts reading tutoring ==
In response to the high rate of students reading below their grade level in the United States, the America Reads Challenge Act of 1997 was proposed. Its main goal was to get children to appropriate reading levels by the time they left third grade (“America Reads Challenge Act,” 1997).3 The No Child Left Behind Act of 2001 had the goal of getting all students to a proficient level in both reading and math by closing the achievement gap. It has now been replaced with the Every Student Succeeds Act at the end of 2015.

== Research on the effectiveness of reading tutoring ==
=== General ===
Much of the research that can be found on tutoring programs is implemented in kindergarten, or first grade, through the third grade. Generally, empirical research finds that students who are tutored perform better on reading assessments at the end of the year relative to their untutored peers. Reading tutoring is usually geared toward students that are considered at-risk or below their grade level in reading achievement. To obtain the desirable higher achievement outcomes for students, tutors—volunteer, family members, and paraprofessionals—must be trained properly on reading correction procedures.

=== Examples of correction procedures ===
- Ask the student to sound out an unknown word that is phonetically regular, and only supply sounds, or the whole word, once the student has tried on their own. Then have the student practice the word on its own, and then in the sentence it was found in
- Remind the student of rules that may help them figure out how to properly pronounce a word
- Supply a word that is phonetically irregular. Then have the student practice the word on its own, and then in the sentence it was found in

=== Parents as tutors ===
There are conflicting results in research on this subject. One study found that parents using either children's books or school materials had no significant impact on the child's reading achievement level (Powell-Smith et al., 2000). Other studies have found that when parents are trained in proper tutoring procedures they can positively impact their child's reading achievement level

== Examples of reading tutoring programs being implemented ==
- Everyone A Reader: San Diego, California (“Everyone a Reader,” n.d.)
- Start Making a Reader Today (SMART): Oregon (“Start Making,” n.d.)
- Reading Partners: California, Colorado, Washington, Minnesota, North Carolina, South Carolina, Oklahoma, Texas, Maryland, New York, and Washington, DC
