= Foreign-language writing aid =

Assistive technology for non-native language users

A foreign language writing aid is a computer program or any other instrument that assists a non-native language user (also referred to as a foreign language learner) in writing decently in their target language. Assistive operations can be classified into two categories: on-the-fly prompts and post-writing checks. Assisted aspects of writing include: lexical, syntactic (syntactic and semantic roles of a word's frame), lexical semantic (context/collocation-influenced word choice and user-intention-driven synonym choice) and idiomatic expression transfer, etc. Different types of foreign language writing aids include automated proofreading applications, text corpora, dictionaries, translation aids and orthography aids.

== Background ==
The four major components in the acquisition of a language are namely; listening, speaking, reading and writing. While most people have no difficulties in exercising these skills in their native language, doing so in a second or foreign language is not that easy. In the area of writing, research has found that foreign language learners find it painstaking to compose in the target language, producing less eloquent sentences and encountering difficulties in the revisions of their written work. However, these difficulties are not attributed to their linguistic abilities.

Many language learners experience foreign language anxiety, feelings of apprehensiveness and nervousness, when learning a second language. In the case of writing in a foreign language, this anxiety can be alleviated via foreign language writing aids as they assist non-native language users in independently producing decent written work at their own pace, hence increasing confidence about themselves and their own learning abilities.

With advancements in technology, aids in foreign language writing are no longer restricted to traditional mediums such as teacher feedback and dictionaries. Known as computer-assisted language learning (CALL), use of computers in language classrooms has become more common, and one example would be the use of word processors to assist learners of a foreign language in the technical aspects of their writing, such as grammar. In comparison with correction feedback from the teacher, the use of word processors is found to be a better tool in improving the writing skills of students who are learning English as a foreign language (EFL), possibly because students find it more encouraging to learn their mistakes from a neutral and detached source. Apart from learners' confidence in writing, their motivation and attitudes will also improve through the use of computers.

Foreign language learners' awareness of the conventions in writing can be improved through reference to guidelines showing the features and structure of the target genre. At the same time, interactions and feedback help to engage the learners and expedite their learning, especially with active participation. In online writing situations, learners are isolated without face-to-face interaction with others. Therefore, a foreign language writing aid should provide interaction and feedback so as to ease the learning process. This complements communicative language teaching (CLT); which is a teaching approach that highlights interaction as both the means and aim of learning a language.

== Automation of proofreading process ==
In accordance with the simple view of writing, both lower-order and higher-order skills are required. Lower-order skills involve those of spelling and transcription, whereas higher order-skills involve that of ideation; which refers to idea generation and organisation. Proofreading is helpful for non-native language users in minimising errors while writing in a foreign language. Spell checkers and grammar checkers are two applications that aid in the automatic proofreading process of written work.

=== Spelling check and applications ===
To achieve writing competence in a non-native language, especially in an alphabetic language, spelling proficiency is of utmost importance. Spelling proficiency has been identified as a good indicator of a learner’s acquisition and comprehension of alphabetic principles in the target language. Documented data on misspelling patterns indicate that majority of misspellings fall under the four categories of letter insertion, deletion, transposition and substitution. In languages where pronunciation of certain sequences of letters may be similar, misspellings may occur when the non-native language learner relies heavily on the sounds of the target language because they are unsure about the accurate spelling of the words. The spell checker application is a type of writing aid that non-native language learners can rely on to detect and correct their misspellings in the target language.

==== Operating modes ====
In general, spell checkers can operate one of two modes, the interactive spell checking mode or the batch spell checking. In the interactive mode, the spell checker detects and marks misspelled words with a squiggly underlining as the words are being typed. On the other hand, batch spell checking is performed on a batch-by-batch basis as the appropriate command is entered. Spell checkers, such as those used in Microsoft Word, can operate in either mode.

==== Evaluation ====
Although spell checkers are commonplace in numerous software products, errors specifically made by learners of a target language may not be sufficiently catered for. This is because generic spell checkers function on the assumption that their users are competent speakers of the target language, whose misspellings are primarily due to accidental typographical errors. The majority of misspellings were found to be attributed to systematic competence errors instead of accidental typographical ones, with up to 48% of these errors failing to be detected or corrected by the generic spell checker used.

In view of the deficiency of generic spell checkers, programs have been designed to gear towards non-native misspellings, such as FipsCor and Spengels. In FipsCor, a combination of methods, such as the alpha-code method, phonological reinterpretation method and morphological treatment method, has been adopted in an attempt to create a spell checker tailored to French language learners. On the other hand, Spengels is a tutoring system developed to aid Dutch children and non-native Dutch writers of English in accurate English spelling.

=== Grammar check and applications ===
Grammar (syntactical and morphological) competency is another indicator of a non-native speaker’s proficiency in writing in the target language. Grammar checkers are a type of computerised application which non-native speakers can make use of to proofread their writings as such programs endeavor to identify syntactical errors. Grammar and style checking is recognized as one of the seven major applications of Natural Language Processing and every project in this field aims to build grammar checkers into a writing aid instead of a robust man-machine interface.

==== Evaluation ====
Currently, grammar checkers are incapable of inspecting the linguistic or even syntactic correctness of text as a whole. They are restricted in their usefulness in that they are only able to check a small fraction of all the possible syntactic structures. Grammar checkers are unable to detect semantic errors in a correctly structured syntax order; i.e. grammar checkers do not register the error when the sentence structure is syntactically correct but semantically meaningless.

Although grammar checkers have largely been concentrated on ensuring grammatical writing, majority of them are modelled after native writers, neglecting the needs of non-native language users. Much research have attempted to tailor grammar checkers to the needs of non-native language users. Granska, a Swedish grammar checker, has been greatly worked upon by numerous researchers in the investigation of grammar checking properties for foreign language learners. The Universidad Nacional de Educación a Distancia has a computerised grammar checker for native Spanish speakers of EFL to help identify and correct grammatical mistakes without feedback from teachers.

=== Dichotomy between spell and grammar checkers ===
Theoretically, the functions of a conventional spell checker can be incorporated into a grammar checker entirely and this is likely the route that the language processing industry is working towards. In reality, internationally available word processors such as Microsoft Word have difficulties combining spell checkers and grammar checkers due to licensing issues; various proofing instrument mechanisms for a certain language would have been licensed under different providers at different times.

== Corpora ==
Electronic corpora in the target language provide non-native language users with authentic examples of language use rather than fixed examples, which may not be reflected in daily interactions. The contextualised grammatical knowledge acquired by non-native language users through exposure to authentic texts in corpora allows them to grasp the manner of sentence formation in the target language, enabling effective writing.

=== Acquisition of lexico-grammatical patterns ===
Concordance set up through concordancing programs of corpora allow non-native language users to conveniently grasp lexico-grammatical patterns of the target language. Collocational frequencies of words (i.e. word pairings frequencies) provide non-native language users with information about accurate grammar structures which can be used when writing in the target language. Collocational information also enable non-native language users to make clearer distinctions between words and expressions commonly regarded as synonyms. In addition, corpora information about the semantic prosody; i.e. appropriate choices of words to be used in positive and negative co-texts, is available as reference for non-native language users in writing. The corpora can also be used to check for the acceptability or syntactic "grammaticality" of their written work.

=== Evaluation ===
A survey conducted on English as a Second Language (ESL) students revealed corpus activities to be generally well received and thought to be especially useful for learning word usage patterns and improving writing skills in the foreign language. It was also found that students' writings became more natural after using two online corpora in a 90-minute training session. In recent years, there were also suggestions to incorporate the applications of corpora into EFL writing courses in China to improve the writing skills of learners.

== Dictionaries ==
Dictionaries of the target learning languages are commonly recommended to non-native language learners. They serve as reference tools by offering definitions, phonetic spelling, word classes and sample sentences. It was found that the use of a dictionary can help learners of a foreign language write better if they know how to use them. Foreign language learners can make use of grammar-related information from the dictionary to select appropriate words, check the correct spelling of a word and look up synonyms to add more variety to their writing. Nonetheless, learners have to be careful when using dictionaries as the lexical-semantic information contained in dictionaries might not be sufficient with regards to language production in a particular context and learners may be misled into choosing incorrect words.

Presently, many notable dictionaries are available online and basic usage is usually free. These online dictionaries allow learners of a foreign language to find references for a word much faster and more conveniently than with a manual version, thus minimising the disruption to the flow of writing. Online dictionaries available can be found under the list of online dictionaries.

=== Different types of dictionaries ===
Dictionaries come in different levels of proficiency; such as advanced, intermediate and beginner, which learners can choose accordingly to the level best suited to them. There are many different types of dictionaries available; such as thesaurus or bilingual dictionaries, which cater to the specific needs of a learner of a foreign language. In recent years, there is also specialised dictionaries for foreign language learners that employ natural language processing tools to assist in the compilations of dictionary entries by generating feedback on the vocabulary that learners use and automatically providing inflectional and/or derivational forms for referencing items in the explanations.

==== Thesaurus ====
The word thesaurus means 'treasury' or 'storehouse' in Greek and Latin is used to refer to several varieties of language resources, it is most commonly known as a book that groups words in synonym clusters and related meanings. Its original sense of 'dictionary or encyclopedia' has been overshadowed by the emergence of the Roget-style thesaurus and it is considered as a writing aid as it helps writers with the selection of words. The differences between a Roget-style thesaurus and a dictionary would be the indexing and information given; the words in thesaurus are grouped by meaning, usually without definitions, while the latter is by alphabetical order with definitions. When users are unable to find a word in a dictionary, it is usually due to the constraint of searching alphabetically by common and well-known headwords and the use of a thesaurus eliminates this issue by allowing users to search for a word through another word based on concept.

Foreign language learners can make use of thesaurus to find near synonyms of a word to expand their vocabulary skills and add variety to their writing. Many word processors are equipped with a basic function of thesaurus, allowing learners to change a word to another similar word with ease. However, learners must be mindful that even if the words are near synonyms, they might not be suitable replacements depending on the context.

==== Spelling dictionaries ====
Sample of a spelling dictionary taken from Berlitz Spell it Right Dictionary

Spelling dictionaries are referencing materials that specifically aid users in finding the correct spelling of a word. Unlike common dictionaries, spelling dictionaries do not typically provide definitions and other grammar-related information of the words. While typical dictionaries can be used to check or search for correct spellings, new and improved spelling dictionaries can assist users in finding the correct spelling of words even when the user does not know the first alphabet or knows it imperfectly. This circumvents the alphabetic ordering limitations of a classic dictionary. These spelling dictionaries are especially useful to foreign language learners as inclusion of concise definitions and suggestions for commonly confused words help learners to choose the correct spellings of words that sound alike or are pronounced wrongly by them.

===== Personal spelling dictionary =====
A personal spelling dictionary, being a collection of a single learner’s regularly misspelled words, is tailored to the individual and can be expanded with new entries that the learner does not know how to spell or contracted when the learner had mastered the words. Learners also use the personal spelling dictionary more than electronic spellcheckers, and additions can be easily made to better enhance it as a learning tool as it can include things like rules for writing and proper nouns, which are not included in electronic spellcheckers. Studies also suggest that personal spelling dictionaries are better tools for learners to improve their spelling as compared to trying to memorize words that are unrelated from lists or books.

==== Bilingual dictionaries ====
Current research have shown that language learners utilise dictionaries predominantly to check for meanings and that bilingual dictionaries are preferred over monolingual dictionaries for these uses. Bilingual dictionaries have proved to be helpful for learners of a new language, although in general, they hold less extensive coverage of information as compared to monolingual dictionaries. Nonetheless, good bilingual dictionaries capitalize on the fact that they are useful for learners to integrate helpful information about commonly known errors, false friends and contrastive predicaments from the two languages.

Studies have shown that learners of English have benefited from the use of bilingual dictionaries on their production and comprehension of unknown words. When using bilingual dictionaries, learners also tend to read entries in both native and target languages and this helps them to map the meanings of the target word in the foreign language onto its counterpart in their native language. It was also found that the use of bilingual dictionaries improves the results of translation tasks by learners of ESL, thus showing that language learning can be enhanced with the use of bilingual dictionaries.

The use of bilingual dictionaries in foreign language writing tests remains a debate. Some studies support the view that the use of a dictionary in a foreign language examination increases the mean score of the test, and hence is one of the factors that influenced the decision to ban the use of dictionaries in several foreign language tests in the UK. More recent studies, however, present that further research into the use of bilingual dictionaries during writing tests have shown that there is no significant differences in the test scores that can be attributed to the use of a dictionary. Nevertheless, from the perspective of foreign language learners, being able to use a bilingual dictionary during a test is reassuring and increases their confidence.

== Translations aids ==
There are many free translation aids online, also known as machine translation (MT) engines, such as Google Translate and Babel Fish (now defunct), that allow foreign language learners to translate between their native language and the target language quickly and conveniently. Out of the three major categories in computerised translation tools; computer-assisted translation (CAT), Terminology data banks and machine translation. Machine translation is the most ambitious as it is designed to handle the whole process of translation entirely without the intervention of human assistance.

Studies have shown that translation into the target language can be used to improve the linguistic proficiency of foreign language learners. Machine translation aids help beginner learners of a foreign language to write more and produce better quality work in the target language; writing directly in the target language without any aid requires more effort on the learners' part, resulting in the difference in quantity and quality.

However, teachers advise learners against the use of machine translation aids as output from the machine translation aids are highly misleading and unreliable; producing the wrong answers most of the time. Over-reliance on the aids also hinder the development of learners' writing skills, and is viewed as an act of plagiarism since the language used is technically not produced by the student.

== Orthography aids ==
Stroke order of Japanese hiragana characters

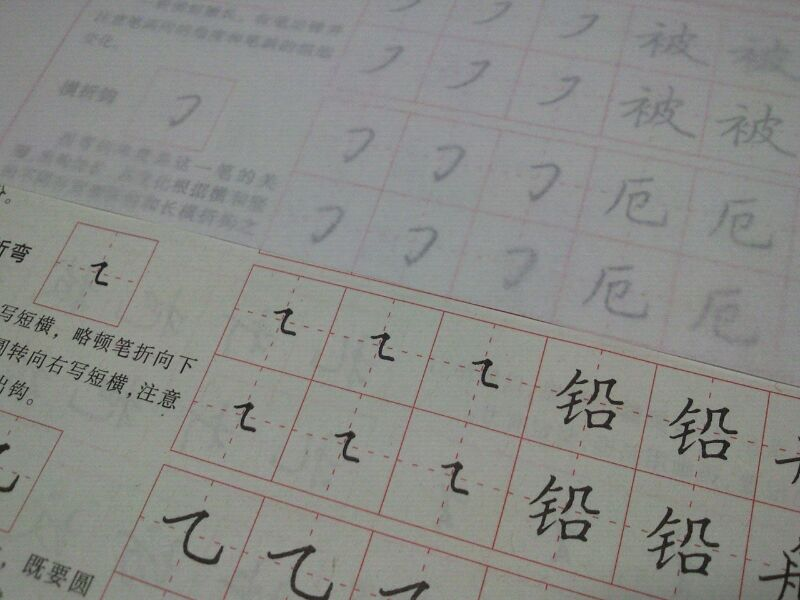
Sample of a Chinese orthography practice book

The orthography of a language is the usage of a specific script to write a language according to a conventionalised usage. One’s ability to read in a language is further enhanced by a concurrent learning of writing. This is because writing is a means of helping the language learner recognise and remember the features of the orthography, which is particularly helpful when the orthography has irregular phonetic-to-spelling mapping. This, in turn, helps the language learner to focus on the components which make up the word.

=== Online ===
Online orthography aids provide language learners with a step-by-step process on learning how to write characters. These are especially useful for learners of languages with logographic writing systems, such as Chinese or Japanese, in which the ordering of strokes for characters are important. Alternatively, tools like Skritter provide an interactive way of learning via a system similar to writing tablets albeit on computers, at the same time providing feedback on stroke ordering and progress.

Handwriting recognition is supported on certain programs, which help language learners in learning the orthography of the target language. Practice of orthography is also available in many applications, with tracing systems in place to help learners with stroke orders.

=== Offline ===
Apart from online orthography programs, offline orthography aids for language learners of logographic languages are also available. Character cards, which contain lists of frequently used characters of the target language, serve as a portable form of visual writing aid for language learners of logographic languages who may face difficulties in recalling the writing of certain characters.

=== Evaluation ===
Studies have shown that tracing logographic characters improves the word recognition abilities of foreign language learners, as well as their ability to map the meanings onto the characters. This, however, does not improve their ability to link pronunciation with characters, which suggests that these learners need more than orthography aids to help them in mastering the language in both writing and speech.

== See also ==
- Computer-assisted language learning
- Foreign-language reading aid
- Language education
- Second language
