= Computer-assisted reviewing =

Text-comparison software

Computer-assisted reviewing (CAR) tools are pieces of software based on text-comparison and analysis algorithms. These tools focus on the differences between two documents, taking into account each document's typeface through an intelligent analysis.

== Detecting differences ==
The intelligent analysis used by CAR tools detect the differences do not have the same value depending on their type and/or the document field/subject. For example, a difference on a number is not the same if this number is a date, a price, a page number, a figure number, a part of an address, a footnote call, a list item number, a title number, etc.

- a title number or a list item number difference can be of no interest if these numbers will be re-calculated afterward before printing or publishing by a text processing tool,
- a small number difference like "1" to "one" or "1" to "1st" is often of secondary interest, depending on the subject and the field of the document
- while some other number differences can be very damageable to the document.

These tools are interesting in various kind of applications:

- comparison between a document and an updated/modified version of it. The main goal is then to highlight the modifications made by a third person or a text processing software.
- comparison between a document edited two file formats: Word, TXT, PDF, HTML, XML. The main goal is to highlight differences implied by the format modification or the conversion/re-formatter software. Often, simple char encoding conversion troubles can cause disasters.

== For translation ==
Computer assisted reviewing for translation (CART) tools are CAR tools being able to manage multi-lingual comparisons. This implies to be able to match each part of text from one document to the other, taking into account the specificity of each language: date/number formats, punctuation (for example, French/English quotation marks), etc. The best CART tools are able to find matches between noun or verbal groups, this implying to find terminological and syntactical elements using linguistic analyzers.

== Application examples ==
- A book author updating his document (often in Word format) while he is receiving printer's proofs (often in PDF), or translations in another language.
- Computer-aided pronunciation teaching uses automatic pronunciation assessment to score learner utterances.
- A web site content manager that should ensure updates and versions consistence of his HTML pages in different languages
- A printer that should ensure the consistency and the quality of his process, possibly using proprietary XML/SGML formats, some automatic treatments, possible manual interventions, done by himself or by a subcontractor.
- An editor through which documents from all actors are transiting
- The MediaWiki "history" on each page is a CAR tool

== See also ==
- Computer-assisted translation
- Language industry
- Translation memory
