= TipTop Technologies =

- Website type: Artificial Intelligence
- Available in: English
- Founded: Shyam Kapur
- Key people: Shyam Kapur founder / CEO
- Website: FeelTipTop.com
- Launched: June 2009
- Current status: Online, Beta

TipTop Technologies is a real-time web and social search engine with a platform for semantic analysis of natural language. Tip-Top Search provides results capturing individual and group sentiment, opinions, and experiences there from the content of various sorts such as real-time messages from Twitter or consumer product reviews on Amazon.com. TipTop Technologies and ITC Infotech collaborated to create a search interface suitable for both enterprise and consumer applications. Tip-Top's products are part of the "emerging Web 3.0 applications which use semantic technologies to augment the underlying Web system's functionalities." Their main product is 360, an AI tool that incorporates multiple AI applications under one wing.

Jonathan AlBright professor at Elon University, found videos generated by TipTop Technologies software on YouTube in his research into artificial intelligence, described it as AI-generated "fake news".

Through semantic analysis of large data sets, TipTop gleaned behavioral insights from Tweets around events like Halloween, Thanksgiving, Holiday Gifting, the Super Bowl, and the Oscar Nominees for the Academy Awards coverage. Sentiment analysis, concept trend tracking, and real-time market research are other applications included in the TipTop Search product. TipTop's insight engine solves the problem of real-time data noise, and its ability to "sort the 'good tweets' from the 'bad tweets' when it comes to a product, service, or a region..."

In addition, products like TipTop Shopping with customizable search widgets bring together consumer reviews, social search, and sentiment analysis enabling product comparisons across attributes like the overall value and aiding purchasing decisions through user-driven product tips and pits. TipTop Finance adds another complexity to real-time search results by incorporating corporate sentiment, company stock tickers, and social media into TipTop's existing social search platform. Additional success applying semantic technologies has been with polling, "if you compare these Gallup results with TipTop, a sentiment engine based on Twitter, the results are not way off. It does surprise you but it tells me that sentiment analysis in case of public opinion about a burning social issue or a famous personality is relatively easier." With the increasing amount of unstructured, opinion-oriented, and user-generated content available on the Web, TipTop's technology aims to make sense of all this data, and deliver it in a useful way for consumer and enterprise users alike.

TipTop Technologies is a privately held company with its headquarters in the San Francisco Bay Area, and team members are located globally.
