= Studies in Natural Language Processing =

Book series

Studies in Natural Language Processing is the book series of the Association for Computational Linguistics, published by Cambridge University Press. Steven Bird is the series editor. The editorial board has the following members: Chu-Ren Huang, Chair Professor of Applied Chinese Language Studies in the Department of Chinese and Bilingual Studies and the Dean of the Faculty of Humanities (The Hong Kong Polytechnic University), Chris Manning, Associate Professor of Linguistics and Computer Science in the Department of Linguistics and Computer Science (Stanford University), Yuji Matsumoto, Professor of Computational Linguistics in Graduate School of Information Science (Nara Institute of Science and Technology), Maarten de Rijke, Professor of Information Processing and Internet in the Informatics Institute (the University of Amsterdam) and Harold Somers, Professor of Language Engineering(Emeritus)in School of Computer Science (University of Manchester).

== Books Currently in Print ==
Authors/Editors	Year	Title	ISBN/DOI
Appelt, D.E.	1992	Planning English Sentences	ISBN 0521438039
Asher, N & A Lascarides	2003	Logics of Conversation	ISBN 0521650585
Bates, M. & R.M. Weischedel (eds)	1993	Challenges in Natural Language Processing	ISBN 0521410150
Bosch, P. & R. van der Sandt (eds)	1998	Focus	ISBN 0521583055
Briscoe, T., A. Copestake & V. de Paiva (eds)	1994	Inheritance, Defaults and the Lexicon	ISBN 0521430275
Busa, F. & P. Bouillon (eds)	2001	The Language of Word Meaning	ISBN 0521780489
Cole, R., J. Mariani, H. Uszkoreit, G.B. Varile, A. Zaenen & A. Zampolli (eds)	1998	Survey of the State of the Art in Human Language Technology	ISBN 0521592771
Daelemans, W. & A. van den Bosch	2005	Memory-Based Language Processing	ISBN 0521808901
Dowty, D.R., L. Karttunen & A.M. Zwicky (eds)	1985	Natural Language Parsing	ISBN 0521262038
Grishman, R.	1986	Computational Linguistics	ISBN 0521310385
Hirst, G.	1992	Semantic Interpretation and the Resolution of Ambiguity	ISBN 052142898X
Huang, C., N. Calzolari, A. Gangemi, A. Lenci, A. Oltramari & L. Prevot (eds)	2010	Ontology and the Lexicon	9780511676536
Kiraz, G.A.	2001	Computational Nonlinear Morphology	ISBN 0521631963
Kornai, A. (ed)	1999	Extended Finite State Models of Language	ISBN 052163198X
Kronfeld, A.	1990	Reference and Computation	ISBN 0521399823
Masterman, M (Y Wilks, ed)	2005	Language, Cohesion and Form	ISBN 0521454891
McKeown, K.R.	1992	Text Generation	ISBN 0521438020
Patten, T.	1988	Systemic Text Generation as Problem Solving	ISBN 052135076X
Rayner, M., D. Carter, P. Bouillon, V. Digalakis & M. Wirén (eds)	2000	The Spoken Language Translator	ISBN 0521770777
Reiter, E. & R. Dale	2000	Building Natural Language Generation Systems	ISBN 0521620368
Rosner, M. & R. Johnson (eds)	1992	Computational Linguistics and Formal Semantics	ISBN 0521429889
Saint-Dizier, P. & E. Viegas (eds)	1995	Computational Lexical Semantics	ISBN 0521444101
Sproat, R.	2000	A Computational Theory of Writing Systems	ISBN 0521663407
Stone Palmer, M.	1990	Semantic Processing for Finite Domains	ISBN 0521362261
