= Sentence extraction =

Text summarization technique

Sentence extraction is a technique used for automatic summarization of a text. In this shallow approach, statistical heuristics are used to identify the most salient sentences of a text. Sentence extraction is a low-cost approach compared to more knowledge-intensive deeper approaches which require additional knowledge bases such as ontologies or linguistic knowledge. In short, sentence extraction works as a filter that allows only meaningful sentences to pass.

The major downside of applying sentence-extraction techniques to the task of summarization is the loss of coherence in the resulting summary. Nevertheless, sentence extraction summaries can give valuable clues to the main points of a document and are frequently sufficiently intelligible to human readers.

== Procedure ==
Usually, a combination of heuristics is used to determine the most important sentences within the document. Each heuristic assigns a (positive or negative) score to the sentence. After all heuristics have been applied, the highest-scoring sentences are included in the summary. The individual heuristics are weighted according to their importance.

=== Early approaches and some sample heuristics ===
Seminal papers which laid the foundations for many techniques used today have been published by Hans Peter Luhn in 1958 and H. P Edmundson in 1969.

Luhn proposed to assign more weight to sentences at the beginning of the document or a paragraph. Edmundson stressed the importance of title-words for summarization and was the first to employ stop-lists in order to filter uninformative words of low semantic content (e.g. most grammatical words such as of, the, a). He also distinguished between bonus words and stigma words, i.e. words that probably occur together with important (e.g. the word form significant) or unimportant information. His idea of using key-words, i.e. words which occur significantly frequently in the document, is still one of the core heuristics of today's summarizers. With large linguistic corpora available today, the tf–idf value which originated in information retrieval, can be successfully applied to identify the key words of a text: If for example the word cat occurs significantly more often in the text to be summarized (TF = "term frequency") than in the corpus (IDF means "inverse document frequency"; here the corpus is meant by document), then cat is likely to be an important word of the text; the text may in fact be a text about cats.

== See also ==
- Sentence boundary disambiguation
- Text segmentation
