= Pronunciation assessment =

Use of speech recognition to verify pronunciation

Automatic pronunciation assessment uses computer speech recognition to determine how accurately speech has been pronounced, instead of relying on a human instructor or proctor. It is also called speech verification, pronunciation evaluation, and pronunciation scoring. This technology is used to grade speech quality, for language testing, for computer-aided pronunciation teaching (CAPT) in computer-assisted language learning (CALL), for speaking skill remediation, and for accent reduction.

Pronunciation assessment is different from dictation or automatic transcription, because instead of determining unknown speech, it verifies learners' pronunciation of known word(s), often from prior transcription of the same utterance; ideally scoring the intelligibility of the learners' speech. Sometimes pronunciation assessment evaluates the prosody of the learners' speech, such as intonation, pitch, tempo, rhythm, and syllable and word stress, although those are usually not essential for being understood in most languages. Pronunciation assessment is also used in reading tutoring, for example in products from Google, Microsoft, and Amira Learning. Automatic pronunciation assessment can also be used to help diagnose and treat speech disorders such as apraxia.

== Intelligibility ==
Intelligibility refers to how well a learner's utterance is understood by a listener, rather than how much it sounds like a native speaker. This is separate from measures of fluency, such as so-called "Goodness of Pronunciation" (GoP) scores, which estimate how closely an utterance aligns with those of native speakers. Intelligibility is widely regarded as the most important communicative goal in pronunciation teaching and assessment. For example, in the Common European Framework of Reference for Languages (CEFR) assessment criteria for "overall phonological control", intelligibility outweighs formally correct pronunciation at all levels.

Studies in applied linguistics have shown that accent reduction does not always increase intelligibility because listeners can often comprehend heavily accented speech without difficulty. Pronunciation assessment systems often rely on acoustic methods such as GoP which compare learner speech to reference models to produce phoneme-level scores, which are in turn aggregated to produce word and phrase scores. While these methods are effective for identifying deviations from native speakers' utterances, they do not effectively measure how understandable speech is to human listeners. Intelligibility is influenced by broader linguistic and contextual factors such as stress placement, speech rate, and coarticulation, which are not represented in purely segmental scores.

The earliest work on pronunciation assessment avoided measuring genuine listener intelligibility, a shortcoming corrected in 2011 at the Toyohashi University of Technology, and included in the Versant high-stakes English fluency assessment from Pearson and mobile apps from 17zuoye Education & Technology, but still missing in 2023 products from Google Search, Microsoft, Educational Testing Service, Speechace, and ELSA. Assessing authentic listener intelligibility is essential for avoiding inaccuracies from accent bias, especially in high-stakes assessments; from words with multiple correct pronunciations; and from phoneme coding errors in machine-readable pronunciation dictionaries.

In 2022, researchers found that some newer speech-to-text systems, based on end-to-end reinforcement learning to map audio signals directly into words, produce word and phrase confidence scores (from 10-25ms audio frame logit aggregation) closely correlated with genuine listener intelligibility. Others have been able to assess intelligibility using Levenshtein or dynamic time warping distance measures from Wav2Vec2 representation of good speech. Further work through 2025 has focused specifically on measuring intelligibility.

A 2024 study of 42 pronunciation and speech coaching apps (32 mobile and 10 web) found that none offered intelligibility assessment. Instead, most feedback addressed segmental features, and the most common score was a measure of accentedness. About 41% of the apps displayed phonetic transcriptions, but fewer than 5% used visual cues for prosody (such as colour or larger lettering for stressed syllables). About a quarter provided perception training using speech from multiple speakers.

== Evaluation ==
Although there are as yet no industry-standard benchmarks for evaluating pronunciation assessment accuracy, researchers occasionally release evaluation speech corpuses for others to use for improving assessment quality. Such evaluation databases often emphasize formally unaccented pronunciation to the exclusion of genuine intelligibility evident from blinded listener transcriptions. As of mid-2025, state of the art approaches for automatically transcribing phonemes typically achieve an error rate of about 10% from known good speech.

The International Speech Communication Association (ISCA) 2025 Workshop on Speech and Language Technology in Education (SLaTE) administered a Speak & Improve Challenge: Spoken Language Assessment and Feedback, introducing benchmarks for evaluating pronunciation assessment and remediation systems across languages, accents, and learner populations. The challenge emphasized cross-lingual generalization and alignment with human intelligibility judgments, for more robust and interpretable assessment systems.

Ethical issues in pronunciation assessment are present in both human and automatic methods. Authentic validity, fairness, and mitigating bias in evaluation are all crucial. Diverse speech data should be included in automatic pronunciation assessment models. Combining human judgments, especially blinded transcriptions from a wide diversity of listeners, with automated feedback can improve accuracy and fairness.

Second language learners benefit substantially from their use of widely available speech recognition systems for dictation, virtual assistants, and AI chatbots. In such systems, users naturally try to correct their own errors evident in speech recognition results that they notice. Such use improves their grammar and vocabulary development along with their pronunciation skills. The extent to which explicit pronunciation assessment and remediation approaches improve on such self-directed interactions remains an open question. Similarly, automatic dictation results have been shown to reflect intelligibility about as well as human scorers.

In early 2026, the evaluation of intelligibility assessment was expanded with the introduction of PathBench, a standardized benchmarking framework specifically focused on pathological speech. Prior to its release, the reliance on fragmented, proprietary datasets for patient privacy reasons made objective comparisons between different assessment algorithms very difficult. PathBench addressed this by unifying evaluation across multiple public and semi-public datasets. The new benchmark emphasizes model evaluation of authentic human comprehensibility by using datasets where ground-truth intelligibility scores are derived directly from blinded listener transcriptions. Along with the benchmark, researchers introduced Dual-ASR Articulatory Precision (DArtP), a reference-free metric that demonstrated high correlation with human listener comprehension. In September 2026, the same researchers introduced Articulatory Inversion-based Neural Acoustic Distance (ART-NAD), a reference-based intelligibility metric that estimates vocal-tract constriction trajectories from speech audio and compares them with reference recordings, matching the average correlation of an earlier neural acoustic distance metric with human listener intelligibility (Pearson r = 0.71) across six pathological-speech datasets in five languages, while providing interpretable visualizations of articulatory deviations over time.

== Recent developments ==
During 2021–22, a smartphone-based CAPT system was used to sense articulation through both audible and inaudible signals, providing feedback at the phoneme level.

Some promising areas for improvement which were being developed in 2024 include articulatory feature extraction and transfer learning to suppress unnecessary corrections. Other interesting advances under development include "augmented reality" interfaces for mobile devices using optical character recognition to provide pronunciation training on text found in user environments.

In 2024, audio multimodal large language models were first described as assessing pronunciation. That work has been carried forward by other researchers in 2025 who report positive results. Subsequently, researchers demonstrated pronunciation scoring by providing a language model with textual descriptions of speech, including the speech-to-text transcript, phoneme sequences, pauses, and phoneme sequence matching; this approach can achieve performance similar to multimodal LLMs that analyze raw audio while avoiding their higher computational cost.

In 2025, the Duolingo English Test authors published a description of their pronunciation assessment method, purportedly built to measure intelligibility rather than accent imitation. While achieving a correlation of 0.82 with expert human ratings, very close to inter-rater agreement and outperforming alternative methods, the method is nonetheless based on experts' scores along the six-point CEFR common reference levels scale, instead of actual blinded listener transcriptions.

Further promising work in 2025 includes assessment feedback aligning learner speech to synthetic utterances using interpretable features, identifying continuous spans of words for remediation feedback; synthesizing corrected speech matching learners' self-perceived voices, which they prefer and imitate more accurately as corrections; and streaming such interactions.

On January 21, 2026, Educational Testing Service's TOEFL iBT high-stakes English language test, required by US university admissions and employers from English as a foreign language applicants more often than all other internet-based tests combined, changed its speaking assessments. While official rubrics claim that the new scoring will be based primarily on intelligibility, the new test's technical description indicates that it judges intelligibility by "correctness of pronunciation, naturalness of speech rhythm, and naturalness of prosody (e.g., syllable stress)" instead of agreement with blinded listener transcription.

In April 2026, Google Search withdrew the assessment and remediation features of their pronunciation widget, which now only plays audio and shows mouth position diagram animations without recording audio. And Google Translate added pronunciation assessment and remediation feedback features.

== In popular culture ==
The 2012 sci-fi horror film Prometheus shows android character David 8 learning to pronounce Proto-Indo-European phrases from a holographic virtual tutor. Rosetta Stone, the first comprehensive language learning application with pronunciation assessment capabilities, was mentioned on Saturday Night Live and How I Met Your Mother.

== See also ==
- Phonetics
- Phonology
- Speech segmentation — often called "forced alignment" (of audio to its expected phonemes) in this context
- Statistical classification
