= Prevalence effect =

Phenomenon that infrequent targets are easily missed

In psychology, the prevalence effect is the phenomenon that one is more likely to miss (or fail to detect) a target with a low prevalence (or frequency) than a target with a high prevalence or frequency. A real-world application of this phenomenon occurs in airport security screening; since a very small proportion of those going through security checkpoints carry weapons, security staff may fail to detect those attempting to carry weapons onto a plane.

In visual perception, target prevalence describes the salience (or visibility) of an object or objects in the environment and influences visual search. An experiment similar to an x-ray baggage search at an airport reveals how likely one is to make errors when searching for low-prevalence targets. A 50-percent prevalence produced a seven-percent error rate, typical for laboratory search tasks of this sort; a 10-percent prevalence produced a 16-percent error rate, and prevalence under one percent produced a 30-percent error rate.

Humans normally search for common things, such as a favorite jelly-bean flavor in a collection of flavors. When they look for rare things (such as a jelly bean in a bag of lollipops), they are likely to abandon the search quickly because the probability of success and the stakes are low. Some searches combine low prevalence with high stakes; medical screenings such as mammography or cytopathology, is an important search for a target rarely present (typically under one percent). Missing a rare target, such as a weapon smuggled onto an airplane, may have serious consequences.

== Past experience or future prospect ==
The prevalence effect is influenced by top-down control of a future prospect or the bottom-up priming of past experience. Top-down refers to the expectation effect: knowledge of what will happen next. The bottom-up, repetition effect is produced by the sharing of properties by current and preceding stimuli. Observers may miss rare targets because they knew that the targets are (or were) rare. Research has attempted to distinguish these possibilities by creating situations in which past experience is different from the future prospect; the target has been frequent in the past, but is known to be rare in the future. It was found that the prevalence effect is a consequence of bottom-up experience and unaffected by top-down control.

=== Nature of the effect ===
Prevalence effects provide insight into how observers adjust their quitting criteria; according to research, observers require a threshold for quitting when no target has been found. This threshold is fluid; observers may slow down after mistakes and speed up after success. When targets are frequent (above 50-percent prevalence), fast "no" responses often lead to mistakes and "no" reaction times are slower than "yes" times in high-prevalence searches. With infrequent targets (low prevalence), searches can successfully say "no" nearly always and drive down the quitting threshold. When the observer is being asked to respond quickly, the absent response (i.e. no target) may sometimes be given inadvertently—producing miss errors.

=== Eye-tracking experiments ===
Eye tracking experiments demonstrate that a large prevalence effect can occur across a group of participants with targets of similar appearance. In the experiment, participants had to discriminate the letter T from several similar-looking Ls. With a low prevalence, participants missed about 40 percent of the rare targets and responded more rapidly to target-absent trails than they did in high-prevalence conditions. (Previous work generally used simple stimuli.) Researchers discovered that when a target is rare, participants spend less time searching before concluding that it is absent (regardless of stimuli complexity). Eye-tracking data suggests that many errors at low prevalence were attributable to participants terminating the search without finding the target. Although cues suggested a higher target probability, searchers took longer to respond "no" (suggesting that the prevalence effect is ingrained).

=== Effects on perception ===
The nature of the prevalence effect is debated, and its source may be attributed to motor error. Researchers found that when observers repeatedly pressed the same key for target-absent trials in low-prevalence blocks, they tended to press the same key too fast even if they could see the target. When participants had a chance to correct their responses, their miss rates were reduced (demonstrating that if motor responses contribute to the prevalence effect, there is a perceptual effect if the task is difficult). Random mapping switched the response keys from trial to trial, preventing the motor responses from becoming automatic. Even with this difference, participants made more errors when the target prevalence was low and allowing observers to correct their decisions does not counteract a low prevalence effect. The prevalence effect disappeared when there was a great discrepancy between gain and loss for correct and incorrect responses, such as when observers competed for a prize.

== Applications ==
In typical laboratory visual-search tasks, observers look for a target item among distractor items. Factors modulating search difficulty are well understood:

1. As the difference between the target and distractors gets smaller, the search becomes harder.
2. As the target definition becomes more abstract, the search becomes more difficult.
3. It is more difficult to find the target if its vicinity is cluttered.
4. Finding an object is more difficult if clutter is random.

Compared to lab experiments, real-world factors are more challenging; customs officers, for example, experience all these factors in their x-ray screening tasks. The target is broadly defined (and changes with time); target items are not always uniquely marked, and distractors are diverse and often similar to the original. X-rays add the challenges of object transparency and overlap, and screeners have a low chance of encountering a weapon; they have a higher prevalence of finding prohibited items (such as water bottles) and opaque areas which may conceal a threat.

Breast-cancer detection is also a generally low-prevalence search task. Researchers who slipped positive images into the workflow of a breast-cancer screening facility found that low-prevalence error rate was over twice as high as that for the same images viewed in a high-prevalence setting. Similar results were found with expert readers of Pap tests.

=== Transport security officers ===
Recently trained transport security officers (TSOs) examined test images of bags with and without inserted threat images; threats were inserted at low and high prevalence rates. Research has found that a period of high-prevalence testing with good feedback to the observer reduces the miss rate for a subsequent period of low prevalence with poor feedback, so a feedback task was introduced between both experiments. Miss error rates were higher at low prevalence than at high, although they provided feedback for the high-prevalence task. The feedback, rather than the prevalence manipulation, may have changed the TSOs’ behavior in the final test. Feedback magnifies the effects of prevalence by giving the searcher information about prevalence. If prevalence alters the behavior of TSOs, it may be counteracted. In laboratory settings, the effect appears resistant to a number of attempted solutions. One solution would be to raise the prevalence rate to 50 percent by adding threat-image projections (TIP) to half of the bags. The time required to clear a bag with a TIP is greater than that required to clear a bag without one, and the bag would need to be re-scanned without the TIP to make sure it did not obscure a real target.

== Prevalence and vigilance ==
Knowledge of the probability of a target in the next bag does not suppress the prevalence effect, suggesting that low-prevalence search is similar to vigilance tasks in which observers await fleeting signals. This phenomenon has been observed in vigilance literature as "signal-probability effects". It has been demonstrated that low signal probability reduces hit rates in classical low-event-rate, low-cognitive-load vigilance tasks by shifting criteria rather than decreasing sensitivity, and these effects are accompanied by slowed "yes" reaction times and faster "no" reaction times.
