= Keyword =

Keyword may refer to:

== Computing ==
- Index term, a term used as a keyword to documents in an information system such as a catalog or a search engine
- Keyword (Internet search), a word or phrase typically used by bloggers or online content creator to rank a web page on a particular topic
- A reserved word in a programming language

== Other uses ==
- Keyword (linguistics), a word that occurs in a text more often than by chance alone
- Keywords: A Vocabulary of Culture and Society, 1973 non-fiction book by Raymond Williams
- "Keyword" (song), a 2008 song by Tohoshinki

== See also ==
- Buzzword
- Trigger word
- Related to index terms:
  - Key Word in Context
  - Keyword advertising, a form of online advertising
  - Keyword clustering, a search engine optimization technique
  - Keyword research
