= Tomáš Mikolov =

Czech computer scientist (born 1982)

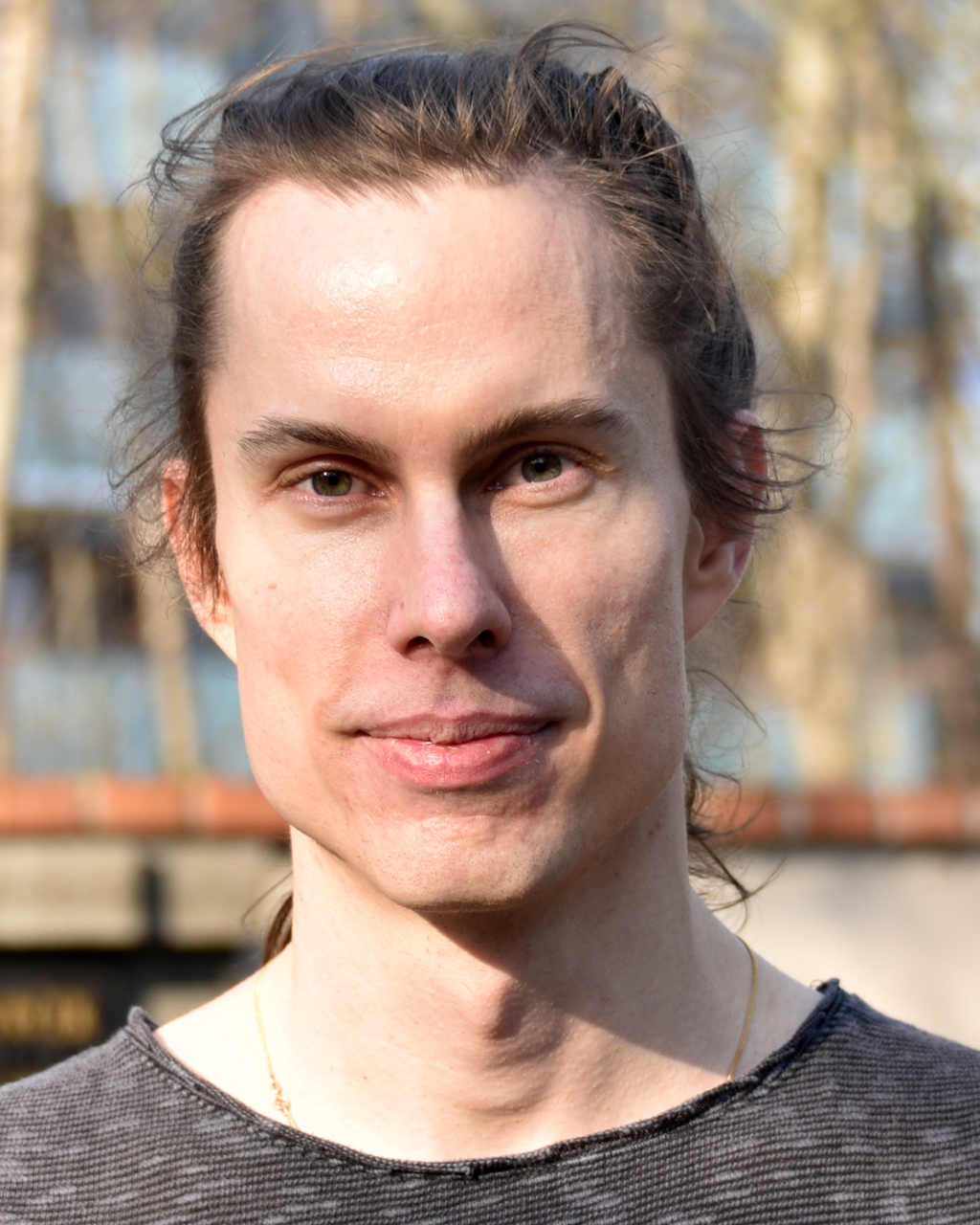
- Mikolov in 2020
- Born: 8 October 1982 (age 44); Šumperk
- Citizenship: Czech
- Education: Brno University of Technology
- Scientific career
- Fields: Computer Science
- Workplaces: Johns Hopkins University; Université de Montréal; Microsoft; Google; Meta; CIIRC; BottleCap AI (co-founder)
- Thesis: Statistical Language Models Based on Neural Networks (2012)

Tomáš Mikolov is a Czech computer scientist known for his work on neural language models and word representations. He was the lead author of the 2013 paper that introduced the word2vec models, a technique for learning word embeddings from text.

Mikolov then co-authored the research behind fastText, which uses character sequences within words to extend word2vec’s approach.

He received his PhD from Brno University of Technology and worked at Microsoft Research, Google Brain, and Facebook AI Research. In 2020, Mikolov joined CIIRC at the Czech Technical University in Prague.

== Career ==
During his doctoral studies at Brno University of Technology, Mikolov spent time at Johns Hopkins University. The six-month visit in 2010 was arranged with the support of Sanjeev Khudanpur and Frederick Jelinek. He also spent a few months in Yoshua Bengio's machine-learning laboratory at the Université de Montréal.

Mikolov then spent three months at Microsoft Research in Redmond, working with Geoffrey Zweig on recurrent neural network language models.

After completing his PhD in 2012, Mikolov joined Google Brain. He led the development of word2vec and worked on using word representations for machine translation. In 2014, he moved to Facebook AI Research (FAIR), where he continued working on natural language processing and fundamental AI research.

He returned to the Czech Republic in 2020 and joined CIIRC, a research institute at the Czech Technical University in Prague. There, he led a research group studying models that could improve through evolution.

In 2025, Mikolov co-founded BottleCap AI, a Prague-based company developing efficient foundation models.

== Research ==
=== Neural language models ===
As a doctoral student at Brno University of Technology, Mikolov worked on applying recurrent neural networks to language modelling. In 2010, he and colleagues presented a model that retained information from preceding words in its internal state. Their experiments showed improvements over n-gram models in text prediction and speech recognition, although training was computationally expensive.

His 2012 dissertation, Statistical Language Models Based on Neural Networks, reported the best published performance at the time on a language-modelling benchmark based on the Penn Treebank.

The 2014 paper Sequence to Sequence Learning with Neural Networks, which introduced an approach to sequence-to-sequence learning, cited Mikolov's research on recurrent neural network language models and their application to machine translation.

=== Word and document representations ===
During his internship at Microsoft Research, Mikolov studied word representations with Geoffrey Zweig and Wen-tau Yih. Their research, published in 2013, showed that differences between word vectors could capture grammatical and semantic relationships.

At Google, Mikolov led the development of word2vec, introduced in 2013. It is a method for learning word embeddings—numerical representations of words—from large collections of text. Words appearing in similar contexts tend to have similar representations. A follow-up paper, Distributed Representations of Words and Phrases and their Compositionality, introduced negative sampling and extended the approach to phrases. The paper received the NeurIPS Test of Time Award in 2023.

Mikolov also worked with Quoc Le and Ilya Sutskever on mapping word vectors between languages to generate and extend translation dictionaries. He and Le then extended representation learning to longer pieces of text with Paragraph Vector, introduced in 2014. The method represents sentences, paragraphs and documents as vectors, which they evaluated on text classification and sentiment analysis.

At Facebook AI Research, Mikolov co-developed fastText, an open-source library released in 2016 for text classification and learning word vectors. Its word-vector models build on shorter character sequences within words, allowing fastText to represent words it did not encounter during training.

== Awards and honours ==
On 28 October 2026, Mikolov received the Czech Republic's Medal of Merit for services to the state in science and technology.
