= Random projection =

Technique to reduce dimensionality of points in Euclidean space

In mathematics and statistics, random projection is a technique used to reduce the dimensionality of a set of points which lie in Euclidean space. According to theoretical results, random projection preserves distances well, but empirical results are sparse. They have been applied to many natural language tasks under the name random indexing.

== Dimensionality reduction ==
Dimensionality reduction, as the name suggests, is reducing the number of random variables using various mathematical methods from statistics and machine learning. Dimensionality reduction is often used to reduce the problem of managing and manipulating large data sets. Dimensionality reduction techniques generally use linear transformations in determining the intrinsic dimensionality of the manifold as well as extracting its principal directions. For this purpose there are various related techniques, including: principal component analysis, linear discriminant analysis, canonical correlation analysis, discrete cosine transform, random projection, etc.

Random projection is a simple and computationally efficient way to reduce the dimensionality of data by trading a controlled amount of error for faster processing times and smaller model sizes. The dimensions and distribution of random projection matrices are controlled so as to approximately preserve the pairwise distances between any two samples of the dataset.

== Method ==
The core idea behind random projection is given in the Johnson-Lindenstrauss lemma, which states that if points in a vector space are of sufficiently high dimension, then they may be projected into a suitable lower-dimensional space in a way which approximately preserves pairwise distances between the points with high probability.

In random projection, the original $d$-dimensional data is projected to a $k$-dimensional subspace, by multiplying on the left by a random matrix $R \in \R^{k \times d}$. Using matrix notation: If $X_{d \times N}$ is the original set of N d-dimensional observations, then $X_{k \times N}^{RP}=R_{k \times d}X_{d \times N}$ is the projection of the data onto a lower k-dimensional subspace. Random projection is computationally simple: form the random matrix "R" and project the $d \times N$ data matrix X onto K dimensions of order $O(dkN)$. If the data matrix X is sparse with about c nonzero entries per column, then the complexity of this operation is of order $O(ckN)$.

=== Orthogonal random projection ===
A unit vector can be orthogonally projected to a random subspace. Let $u$ be the original unit vector, and let $v$ be its projection. The norm-squared $\|v\|_2^2$ has the same distribution as projecting a random point, uniformly sampled on the unit sphere, to its first $k$ coordinates. This is equivalent to sampling a random point in the multivariate gaussian distribution $x \sim \mathcal N(0, I_{d \times d})$, then normalizing it.

Therefore, $\|v\|_2^2$ has the same distribution as $\frac{\sum_{i=1}^k x_i^2}{\sum_{i=1}^k x_i^2 + \sum_{i=k+1}^{d} x_i^2}$, which by the chi-squared construction of the Beta distribution, has distribution $\operatorname{Beta}(k/2, (d-k)/2)$, with mean $k/d$.

We have a concentration inequality $Pr\left[\left|\|v\|_2-\frac{k}{d}\right| \geq \epsilon \sqrt{\frac{k}{d}}\right] \leq 3 \exp \left(-k \epsilon^2 / 64\right)$ for any $\epsilon \in (0, 1)$.

=== Gaussian random projection ===
The random matrix R can be generated using a Gaussian distribution. The first row is a random unit vector uniformly chosen from $S^{d-1}$. The second row is a random unit vector from the space orthogonal to the first row, the third row is a random unit vector from the space orthogonal to the first two rows, and so on. In this way of choosing R, and the following properties are satisfied:

- Spherical symmetry: For any orthogonal matrix $A \in O(d)$, RA and R have the same distribution.
- Orthogonality: The rows of R are orthogonal to each other.
- Normality: The rows of R are unit-length vectors.

=== More computationally efficient random projections ===
Achlioptas has shown that the random matrix can be sampled more efficiently. Either the full matrix can be sampled IID according to

$$R_{i,j} = \sqrt{3/k} \times \begin{cases}
+1 & \text{with probability }\frac{1}{6}\\
0 & \text{with probability }\frac{2}{3}\\
-1 & \text{with probability }\frac{1}{6} \end{cases}$$

or the full matrix can be sampled IID according to
$$R_{i,j} = \sqrt{1/k} \times \begin{cases}
+1 & \text{with probability }\frac{1}{2}\\
-1 & \text{with probability }\frac{1}{2} \end{cases}$$
Both are efficient for database applications because the computations can be performed using integer arithmetic. More related study is conducted in.

It was later shown how to use integer arithmetic while making the distribution even sparser, having very few nonzeroes per column, in work on the Sparse JL Transform. This is advantageous since a sparse embedding matrix means being able to project the data to lower dimension even faster.

=== Random Projection with Quantization ===
Random projection can be further condensed by quantization (discretization), with 1-bit (sign random projection) or multi-bits. It is the building block of SimHash, RP tree, and other memory efficient estimation and learning methods.

== Large quasiorthogonal bases ==
The Johnson-Lindenstrauss lemma states that large sets of vectors in a high-dimensional space can be linearly mapped in a space of much lower (but still high) dimension n with approximate preservation of distances. One of the explanations of this effect is the exponentially high quasiorthogonal dimension of n-dimensional Euclidean space. There are exponentially large (in dimension n) sets of almost orthogonal vectors (with small value of inner products) in n–dimensional Euclidean space. This observation is useful in indexing of high-dimensional data.

Quasiorthogonality of large random sets is important for methods of random approximation in machine learning. In high dimensions, exponentially large numbers of randomly and independently chosen vectors from equidistribution on a sphere (and from many other distributions) are almost orthogonal with probability close to one. This implies that in order to represent an element of such a high-dimensional space by linear combinations of randomly and independently chosen vectors, it may often be necessary to generate samples of exponentially large length if we use bounded coefficients in linear combinations. On the other hand, if coefficients with arbitrarily large values are allowed, the number of randomly generated elements that are sufficient for approximation is even less than dimension of the data space.

== Implementations ==
- RandPro - An R package for random projection
- sklearn.random_projection - A module for random projection from the scikit-learn Python library
- Weka implementation

== See also ==
- Locality-sensitive hashing
- Random mapping
- Johnson–Lindenstrauss lemma
