= Latent semantic structure indexing =

Latent semantic structure indexing (LaSSI) is a technique for calculating chemical similarity derived from latent semantic analysis (LSA).

LaSSI was developed at Merck & Co. and patented in 2007 by Richard Hull, Eugene Fluder, Suresh Singh, Robert Sheridan, Robert Nachbar and Simon Kearsley.

== Overview ==
LaSSI is similar to LSA in that it involves the construction of an occurrence matrix from a corpus of items and the application of singular value decomposition to that matrix to derive latent features. What differs is that the occurrence matrix represents the frequency of two- and three-dimensional chemical descriptors (rather than natural language terms) found within a chemical database of chemical structures. This process derives latent chemical structure concepts that can be used to calculate chemical similarities and structure–activity relationships for drug discovery.
