= Scott Deerwester =

American computer scientist

Scott Craig Deerwester is an American computer scientist and computer engineer. He is known for his contributions to the development of latent semantic analysis (LSA), a mathematical and natural language processing (NLP) technique

== Early life ==
Deerwester was born in Rossville, Indiana, United States in January 1956.

== Publications and research work ==
Deerwester contributed to the development of LSA during his time at Colgate University and the University of Chicago. He published his first research paper, The Retrieval Expert Model of Information Retrieval, at Purdue University in 1984.

LSA is used in natural language processing applications, including chatbots and automatic translation services, and is capable of emulating human-like patterns and behaviors, such as word sorting and category assessment. LSA has found applications in data mining, recommender systems, and business intelligence tools. This research has also been useful in the development of Latent Dirichlet Allocation (LDA) and probabilistic models, which are used in topic modelling and semantic analysis.

In 1988, Deerwester co-authored a research paper on latent semantic analysis (LSA). The paper proposed an alteration to information retrieval systems that would process textual information by deriving a semantic structure. Notably, the techniques introduced in the paper allowed search engines to retrieve relevant documents that lacked exact keywords. This was done by accounting for polysemy and synonymy.

Deerwester's latest work was published in 2017.
