= Thought vector =

Computer term

Thought vector is a term popularized by Geoffrey Hinton, the prominent deep-learning researcher, which uses vectors based on natural language to improve its search results.
