= George Furnas =

American academic

George William Furnas
- Born: 1954 (age 71–72)
- Known for: Latent semantic analysis; Generalized fisheye views; Vocabulary disagreement problem
- Awards: CHI Academy (2004); ACM Fellow (2011)

Academic background
- Education: Harvard University (AB); Stanford University (PhD)

Academic work
- Discipline: Human–computer interaction; Information science
- Institutions: Bell Labs (1980–1995); University of Michigan (1995–present)
- Website: furnas.people.si.umich.edu

George William Furnas (born 1954) is an American academic, Professor and Associate Dean for Academic Strategy at the School of Information of the University of Michigan, known for his work on semantic analysis and on human-system communication.

== Biography ==
Furnas obtained his AB in Psychology in 1974 from Harvard University, and his PhD in Psychology in 1980 from Stanford University.

Furnas started his academic career as a graduate student teaching assistant at Stanford University in 1975. After graduating in 1980, he joined Bell Labs, where he was a distinguished member of the technical staff for 15 years. In the last two years, he was Director of Computer Graphics and Interactive Media research. In 1995, he moved to the University of Michigan, where he was appointed Professor of Psychology, Professor of Computer Science and Engineering, and Professor at the School of Information. From 2002 to 2008, he was also Associate Dean for Academic Strategy, School of Information.

Furnas was elected to the CHI Academy, an honorary group of individuals who have made substantial contributions to the field of human-computer interaction, in 2004 for his work. In 2011, he was inducted as a Fellow of the Association for Computing Machinery.

== Work ==
During his time at Bell Labs, he earned the moniker "Fisheye Furnas" while working with fisheye visualizations. A pioneer of latent semantic analysis, Furnas is also considered a pioneer in the concept of MoRAS (Mosaic of Responsive Adaptive Systems).

The body of Furnas' research, and its primacy in the field, is aptly précised by the delineation of his work in his SIGCHI bio:

A principal focus of his research is in advanced information access and visualization. His early role in the analysis of the "Vocabulary Disagreement" problem lead to his co-invention of Latent Semantic Analysis for indexing and text processing. His classic "Generalized Fisheye Views" paper inspired a sea of focus+context research in information visualization.

And furthermore

George's BITPICT graphical rewrite system is well known novel contribution to diagrammatic reasoning, visual languages and visual programming communities. George was also an early researcher in the areas of collaborative filtering and graph visualization. His "Space-Scale Diagrams in the Pad++ Zooming User Interface" advanced the analysis of zoomable user interfaces, and View Navigation theory has helped motivate much subsequent research in Information Scent. Recently he has been working on consolidating theories of design and use at multiple levels of aggregation.

== Selected publications ==
- Furnas, George W. Objects and their features, 1980

Articles, a selection:

- Furnas, George W. "Generalized fisheye views." in Human Factors in Computing Systems CHI '86 Conference Proceedings, 16-23. 1986.
- Furnas, George W., et al. "The vocabulary problem in human-system communication." Communications of the ACM 30.11 (1987): 964-971.
- Deerwester, Scott C., et al. "Indexing by latent semantic analysis." JAsIs 41.6 (1990): 391-407.
