= German Reference Corpus =

The German Reference Corpus (original: Deutsches Referenzkorpus; short: DeReKo) is an electronic archive of text corpora of contemporary written German. It was first created in 1964 and is hosted at the Institute for the German Language (Leibniz Institute for the German Language, abbr. : IDS) in Mannheim, Germany. The corpus archive is continuously updated and expanded. It currently comprises more than 4.0 billion word tokens (as of August 2010) and constitutes the largest linguistically motivated collection of contemporary German texts. Today, it is one of the major resources worldwide for the study of written German.

== Alternative names ==
The German Reference Corpus is often referred to by other names, such as Mannheim corpora, IDS corpora, COSMAS corpora and the corresponding German translations. The name Deutsches Referenzkorpus (DeReKo) was originally used for a specific portion of the current archive which was collected between 1999 and 2002 by a number of institutions in a joint project under the same name. Since 2004, Deutsches Referenzkorpus (DeReKo) is the official name of the full corpus archive.

== Conception and composition ==
The German Reference Corpus comprises fictional and academic texts, a large number of newspaper texts and several other text types. The texts cover the time range from around 1950 to the present.

In contrast to other well-known corpora and corpus archives (such as the British National Corpus), however, the German Reference Corpus is explicitly not designed as a balanced corpus: The distribution of DeReKo texts across time or text types does not match some predefined percentages.

This conception complies with the fact that whether or not a given corpus constitutes a balanced or even representative language sample may only be assessed with respect to a specific language domain (i.e., the statistical population). Because different linguistic investigations generally aim at different language domains, the declared purpose of the German Reference Corpus is to serve as a versatile superordinate sample, or primordial sample (German: Ur-Stichprobe) of contemporary written German, from which corpus users may draw a specialised subsample (a so-called virtual corpus) to represent the language domain they wish to investigate.

== Access ==
Due to copyright and licence restrictions, the DeReKo archive may not be copied nor offered for download. It can be queried and analyzed free of charge via the system COSMAS II - end-users are required to register by name and to agree to use the corpus data exclusively for non-commercial, academic purposes. COSMAS II enables users to compile from DeReKo a virtual corpus suitable for their specific research questions.

== See also ==
- Text corpus
- Corpus linguistics
- American National Corpus (ANC)
- Bank of English (BoE)
- British National Corpus (BNC)
- Corpus of Contemporary American English (COCA)
- Oxford English Corpus (OEC)
