= LIVAC Synchronous Corpus =

Chinese language database

LIVAC
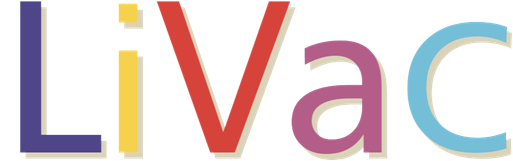
- The logo of LiVAC.
- Developer: Chilin (HK) Ltd.
- Initial release: July 1995
- Stable release: V4.0 / Feb 2026
- Operating system: Cross-platform
- Available in: English, Traditional and Simplified Chinese
- Type: Corpus
- Website: www.livac.org

LIVAC is an uncommon language corpus dynamically maintained since 1995. Different from other existing corpora, LIVAC has adopted a rigorous and regular "Windows" approach in processing and filtering massive media texts from representative Chinese speech communities such as Beijing, Hong Kong, Macau, Taipei, Singapore, Shanghai, as well as Guangzhou, and Shenzhen. The contents are thus deliberately repetitive in most cases, represented by textual samples drawn from editorials, local and international news, cross-Taiwan Strait news, as well as news on finance, sports and entertainment. By 2023, more than 3 billion characters of news media texts have been filtered, of which 700 million characters have been processed and analyzed and have yielded an expanding Pan-Chinese dictionary of 2.5 million words from the Pan-Chinese printed media. Through rigorous analysis based on computational linguistic methodology, LIVAC has at the same time accumulated a large amount of accurate and meaningful statistical data on the Chinese language and on their diverse speech communities in the Pan-Chinese context, and the results show considerable and important long standing as well as evolving variations.

The "Windows" approach is the most innovative feature of LIVAC and has enabled Pan-Chinese media texts to be quantitatively analyzed according to various attributes such as locations, time and subject domains. Thus, various types of comparative studies and applications in information technology as well as development of often related innovative applications have been possible. Moreover, LIVAC has allowed longitudinal developments to be taken into account, facilitating Key Word in Context (KWIC) search and comprehensive study of target words and their underlying concepts as well as linguistic structures over the past 25 years, based on the above mentioned variables of location, time and subject. Results from the extensive and accumulative data analysis contained in LIVAC have enabled the cultivation of textual databases of proper names, place names, organization names, new words, and bi-weekly and annual rosters of media figures. Related applications have included the establishment of verb and adjective databases, the formulation of sentiment indices, and related opinion mining, to measure and compare the popularity of global media figures in the Chinese media (LIVAC Annual Pan-Chinese Celebrity Rosters, later renamed as the Pan-Chinese Newsmaker Rosters). Notable among these are the decades long periodic reviews of the 25 years of annual pan-Chinese rosters since 2000 and compilation of new word databases (LIVAC Annual Pan-Chinese New Word Rosters). On this basis, the analysis of the emergence, diffusion and transformation of new words, and the publication of dictionaries of neologisms have been made possible.

A recent focus is on the relative balance between disyllabic words and growing trisyllabic words in the Chinese language, and the comparative study of light verbs in three Chinese speech communities. as well as the link between the language use and use of language as a reflection of epochal change in China. A new LIVAC version 3.1 was launched in February 2024.

== Corpus data processing ==
1. Accessing media texts, manual input, etc.
2. Text unification including conversion from simplified to traditional Chinese characters, stored as Big5 and Unicode versions
3. Automatic word segmentation
4. Automatic alignment of parallel texts
5. Manual verification, part-of-speech tagging
6. Extraction of words and addition to regional sub-corpora
7. Combination of regional sub-corpora to update the LIVAC corpus, and master lexical database

== Labeling for data curation ==
1. Categories used include general terms and proper names, such as: general names, surnames, semi titles; geographical, organizations and commercial entities, etc.; time, prepositions, locations, etc.; stack-words; loanwords; case-word; numerals, etc.
2. Construction of databases of proper names, place names, and specific terms, etc.
3. Generate rosters: "new word rosters", "celebrity or media personality rosters", "place name rosters", compound words and matched words
4. Other parts of speech tagging for sub-database, such as common nouns, numerals, numeral classifiers, different types of verbs, and of adjectives, pronouns, adverbs, prepositions, conjunctions, particles marking mood, onomatopoeia, interjection, etc.

== Applications ==
1. Compilation of Pan-Chinese dictionaries or local dictionaries
2. Information technology research, such as predictive Chinese text input for mobile phones, automatic speech to text conversion, opinion mining
3. Comparative studies on linguistic and cultural developments in the Pan-Chinese regions, especially in a critical period of history in modern China.
4. Language teaching and learning research, and speech-to-text conversion
5. Customized service on linguistic research and lexical search for international corporations and government agencies

The above applications are provided by the following functions:

- Word Segmentation Search
- Phrase Search
- Example Sentence Selection
- Multi-word Comparison
- Word Cloud

== See also ==
- British National Corpus
- Oxford English Corpus
- Corpus of Contemporary American English (COCA)
- 語料庫
