= Hamshahri (disambiguation) =

Hamshahri may refer to:

- Hamshahri, a major national Iranian Persian-language newspaper published by the Municipality of Tehran
- Hamshahri Corpus, a sizable Persian corpus based on the Iranian newspaper Hamshahri
- Hamshahri (film), a 1983 Iranian documentary film directed by Abbas Kiarostami
