= HNK =

HNK may refer to:

- Croatian National Corpus (Croatian: Hrvatski nacionalni korpus)
- Croatian National Theatre (disambiguation) (Croatian: Hrvatsko narodno kazalište)
- Fist of the North Star (Japanese: Hokuto no Ken) a manga and its franchise
- Honokiol, a lignan
- Hydroxynorketamine, a metabolite of ketamine
- Land of the Lustrous (Japanese: Hōseki no Kuni) a manga
- Hrvatski nogometni klub, a number of Croatian football clubs have HNK in their official name
