= GRAC =

GRAC may refer to:

- Great Rivers Athletic Conference
- Guide to Receptors and Channels
- the Game Rating and Administration Committee of South Korea
- General Regionally Annotated Corpus of Ukrainian
