= Nasser Karami =

Iranian climatologist

- ناصر کرمی
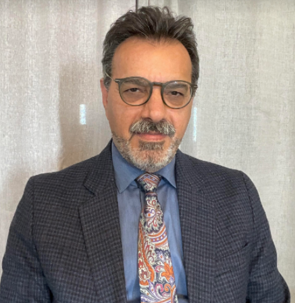
- Karami in 2024
- Born: 1967 (age 58–59); Khuzestan province, Iran
- Occupations: Climatologist, writer
- Known for: Research on drought, water scarcity, climate change and environmental governance

Nasser Karami (Persian: ناصر کرمی; born 1967) is an Iranian climatologist, environmental researcher and writer based in Norway. His research focuses on climate change, drought, water scarcity in the Middle East and North Africa, sustainable development in arid regions, and the political dimensions of environmental degradation.

He is the author of novels, short-story collections and works of non-fiction published in Persian and Norwegian.

Karami has held academic appointments at the University of Bergen and the Norwegian University of Science and Technology (NTNU). Before relocating to Norway in 2013, he spent more than two decades in Iran as a university lecturer, environmental researcher and environmental journalist for Hamshahri.

== Life and academic career ==
Karami was born in Khuzestan province, in southwestern Iran.

He worked for more than two decades at Iranian universities and research institutions before relocating to Norway in 2013 through the IIE Scholar Rescue Fund and Scholars at Risk programmes.

From 2013 to 2015, he was an IIE Scholar Rescue Fund fellow at the University of Bergen, becoming the first scholar hosted by the university through its Scholars at Risk programme.

He later joined the Norwegian University of Science and Technology (NTNU) as an associate professor in the Department of Geography. His research has focused on drought, desertification, groundwater depletion, land degradation, and the environmental, social and geopolitical impacts of climate change in Iran and the wider Middle East.

In 2014, The Washington Post cited Karami's research in a report on Iran's water crisis, noting his argument that decades of unsustainable development and excessive groundwater extraction had severely depleted the country's water resources.

His work on environmental change, desertification and water scarcity has also been featured by Panorama Nyheter, while Deutsche Welle cited his analysis of groundwater depletion around Tehran in 2025.

== Writing ==
Karami writes both fiction and non-fiction in Persian and Norwegian. His literary works include novels and short-story collections, while his non-fiction has focused on environmental issues, geography, sustainable development, tourism and ecological thought.

His Norwegian-language book En grønn livsstilsguide: 111 prinsipper for en daglig grønn og miljøvennlig livsstil ("A Green Lifestyle Guide") was published in 2024 and presents practical principles for environmentally sustainable everyday life.

In 2026, Forough Publishing in Cologne published his Persian-language book Mosallas-e Totalitarism va Mohit-e Zist (مثلث توتالیتاریسم و محیط زیست; The Triangle of Totalitarianism and the Environment). The book examines the relationship between authoritarian political systems, radical strands of environmental thought, and the exploitation of nature, arguing that environmental degradation is closely linked to structures of political domination.

== Journalism ==
Alongside his academic career, Karami worked for nearly two decades as an editor and environmental journalist at Hamshahri, where he wrote extensively on air pollution, water scarcity, urban development and environmental policy.

According to Norwegian university publications, his environmental reporting and research in Iran resulted in professional restrictions and imprisonment before he left the country in 2013.

In 2016, the French children's non-fiction book Des héros pour la Terre: Des citoyens qui défendent la planète devoted a chapter to Karami entitled Écrire contre le danger de la sécheresse ("Writing Against the Threat of Drought"), highlighting his environmental journalism, research on drought and subsequent academic career in Norway.

== Recognition ==
Karami received the Nowruz Award of the Pasargad Heritage Foundation in the field of environmental and natural heritage in 2009 and again in 2024. The foundation cited his long-standing contributions to environmental research, public education and sustainable development, as well as his work promoting awareness of climate change and water scarcity in Iran.

== Books ==
The following bibliography is based on published author profiles, bibliographic records and the title pages of Karami's books.

=== Fiction ===
- Talkhak (1998)
- Journey to the Deep Blue Sea (short-story collection, 2003)
- Riga Evening Light (2005)
- Bi-Nahayat (Eternity, 2011)
- Zagros

=== Non-fiction ===
- Sustainable Development in Dry Areas (1999)
- Techniques of Sustainable Tourism (2003)
- Revelation in Travel (2004)
- Land and People of Kuwait (2006)
- Land and People of Oman (2007)
- Iran's Pathfinder (2008)
- Principles of Greenism (2024)
- En grønn livsstilsguide: 111 prinsipper for en daglig grønn og miljøvennlig livsstil (2024)
- Mosallas-e Totalitarism va Mohit-e Zist (The Triangle of Totalitarianism and the Environment, 2026)

== Selected research and articles ==
The following list includes a selection of Karami's peer-reviewed publications and conference papers on climate change, environmental degradation and water management.

- Monikh, Fazel Abdolahpur; Karami, Omid; Hosseini, Mehdi; Karami, Naser; Bastami, Afshin Abdi; Ghasemi, Amir Faraz (2013). "The Effect of Primary Producers of Experimental Aquatic Food Chains on Mercury and PCB153 Biomagnification". Ecotoxicology and Environmental Safety. 94: 112–115. doi:10.1016/j.ecoenv.2013.05.013. PMID 23735895.
- Karami, Nasser (2016). "Factors of Climate Extremes Hyperactivity: A Study on MENA". International Journal of Geography and Regional Planning. 2 (1): 11–20.
- Karami, Nasser (2018). "The Drying of Lake Urmia as a Case of the "Aralism" Concept in Totalitarian Systems". International Journal of Geography and Regional Planning. 4 (1): 43–63.
- Karami, Nasser (2019). "The Modality of Climate Change in the Middle East: Drought or Drying Up?". The Journal of Interrupted Studies. 2 (1): 118–140. doi:10.1163/25430149-00201003.
- Karami, Nasser (2015). Assessment of the Impact of Changes in Cultivation Pattern from Grape to Apple on the Drying Up of Lake Urmia. International Conference on Environmental Systems Science and Engineering.
