= Slovenian National Corpus =

Slovenian National Corpus FidaPLUS is the 621 million words (tokens) corpus of the Slovene language, gathered from selected texts written in Slovenian of different genres and styles, mainly from books and newspapers.

The FidaPLUS database is an upgrade of the older (FIDA) corpus, which was developed between 1997 and 2000, with added texts that were published up to 2006 and was the result of the applicative research project of the Faculty of Arts, Faculty of Social Sciences, both University of Ljubljana, and Jožef Stefan Institute's Department of Knowledge Technologies.

Corpus is available via a corpus manager Sketch Engine. This version FidaPLUS corpus contains Word sketches, an automatic corpus-derived overview of word's grammatical and collocational behaviour.

Year of publication	Number of words	Percent
1979 - 1990	262.708	0.04%
1991	1.487.895	0.24%
1992	2.256.692	0.36%
1993	3.208.687	0.52%
1994	7.534.689	1.21%
1995	7.433.897	1.2%
1996	16.913.916	2.27%
1997	31.589.250	5.09%
1998	43.512.041	7.01%
1999	54.711.630	8.81%
2000	57.677.534	9.29%
2001	74.720.532	12.03%
2002	72.802.484	11.72%
2003	82.897.097	13.35%
2004	67.041.167	10.79%
2005	39.086.695	6.29%
2006	44.526.825	7.17%
N/A	13.486.261	2,17%
