= Kushim =

Kushim may refer to:

- Cushi, a Hebrew term generally used to refer to a dark-skinned person usually of African descent
- Kushim (Uruk period), a Sumerian beer manufacturer, and the possible earliest known example of a named person in writing
