= List of oldest documents =

The following is a list of the world's oldest surviving physical documents. (That is, the oldest—or earliest—known writings, written works, or works of writing in the historical record surviving as physical documents to the present.)

== List ==
=== Proto writing ===
Document	Date	Location	Description
Kish tablet	c. 3500 BC	Babylon, Iraq	A small limestone tablet from the middle Uruk period of ancient Mesopotamia, contains pictographic inscriptions exemplifying an early precursor to Cuneiform. Many similar tablets have been found from the same period, all of which have proven difficult to date using radiocarbon dating; among these, the Kish tablet has the earliest proposed date of manufacture.

=== Writing ===
Document	Language	Date	Location	Description
Kushim (Uruk period)	Undetermined (proto-cuneiform)	c. 3200–3000 BC	Uruk, Iraq	Administrative clay tablets documenting barley and beer production. They contain the signs KU.ŠIM, possibly identifying an official named Kushim, among the earliest recorded personal names.
Narmer Palette	Egyptian	c. 3100 BC	Aswan, Egypt	A carved slab of siltstone from the Early Dynastic Period of Ancient Egypt, contains some of the earliest known examples of Egyptian hieroglyphs. Notably, the palette contains carved Serekhs bearing the rebus symbols n'r (catfish) and mr (chisel). These are believed to be a phonetic representation of Narmer, the first King of Upper and Lower Egypt following their unification around 3100 BC.
MacGregor plaque	Egyptian	c. 2985 BC	Egypt	Den defeats an enemy of Egypt
Diary of Merer	Egyptian	c.2589 – c. 2566 BC	Giza, Egypt	Logbook of a worker on the Great Pyramid of Khufu describing his journeys to ferry stones from the quarries and some of his work on other construction sites.
Stele of the Vultures	Sumerian	c. 2475 BC	Dhi Qar, Iraq	Celebrates the victory of Lagash after defeating Umma in the Umma–Lagash war
Palermo Stone	Egyptian	c. 2450 BC		A stele containing the names of kings and other information, is made of basalt. Fragments of the piece exist, with some of them reportedly found in Memphis and others in Middle Egypt. As of 2026, the primary piece that is referred to as the Palermo stone is on display in Italy, having been purchased by a Sicilian lawyer named Ferdinand Guidano in 1859.
Giza writing board	Egyptian	c. 2345 BC	Giza, Giza Governorate, Egypt	Contains a list of kings and deities
Istanbul 2461		c. 2030 BC	Al-Qadisiyyah, Iraq	The oldest surviving love poem, a balbale, in the world is of Sumerian origin and written in cuneiform, discovered in Nippur. Written on a clay tablet measuring 10.7 × 6 × 3.1 cm, it is believed to have been written by a bride of the Sumerian king Shu-Sin, who reigned from around 2037-2028 BC. The tablet is on display at the Istanbul Archaeology Museums. Bridegroom, dear to my heart, Goodly is your beauty, honeysweet, Lion, dear to my heart, Goodly is your beauty, honeysweet. — Istanbul #2461
Ikhernofret Stela	Egyptian	c. 1864 BC	Egypt	A description of Osiris
Complaint tablet to Ea-nasir	Akkadian	c. 1750 BC	Dhi Qar, Iraq	The first recorded customer complaint. It was written by a customer named Nanni, who complains that copper which he purchased from the merchant Ea-Nasir was of the incorrect grade.

=== 14th century BC ===
In 2010, a clay fragment bearing Akkadian cuneiform, comparable in size to that of an olive, was discovered by Israeli archaeologists during the excavation of a tower, the tower itself dating back to the 10th century BC, in Jerusalem, that was determined to have originated in 14th century BC. The document, nearly 3,400 years old at the time of its discovery, was older than any other ancient text discovered in Jerusalem by at least 600 years. Further examination revealed that the clay had originated in the Jerusalem area and that the scribe responsible was highly skilled. It is the only cuneiform text to have ever been discovered in the area. Previously, the oldest document found in Jerusalem was a tablet, found in the Shiloah water tunnel, dating back to 8th century BC.

=== 13th century BC ===
Extant direct records from the Shang dynasty date from approximately 1250 BC. These records primarily consist of oracle bones and bronze inscriptions, and also include a small number of other writings on pottery, jade and other materials.

=== 4th century BC ===
The oldest of the Dead Sea Scrolls are thought to date from this period, although some may be as recent as the 1st century AD. They are written almost entirely in Hebrew, Aramaic, and Greek. About 30% of the Hebrew Bible is accounted for in these ancient scrolls and fragments, as well as a vast library of other historical, apocalyptic, legal, and devotional texts.

The oldest bamboo slips date from this period, including the Tsinghua Bamboo Slips and Changtaiguan Bamboo Slips.

=== 2nd century BC ===
The Nash Papyrus, a collection of four papyrus fragments written in Hebrew, was found in 1898, and was, prior to the discovery of the Dead Sea Scrolls, the oldest known example of the written Hebrew language. The fragments contain parts of the Ten Commandments and the Shema Yisrael. The documents were acquired in Egypt, by W. L. Nash, and are believed to have originated in Faiyum, though it is possible they originated elsewhere.

The map found at Fangmatan Tomb 5 is the earliest extant paper (not papyrus, parchment, bamboo slips, etc.) document.

=== 1st century BC ===
Gandhāran Buddhist texts are the oldest known manuscripts originating in South Asia. They are written on birch bark or palm leaves, in the Gandhari language, and are housed in various collections around the world.

=== 1st century AD ===
Gabriel's Revelation is a stone tablet, written in ink.

=== 11th century ===
The Celtic Psalter, Scotland's oldest surviving book, written in Latin, dating back to the 11th century or earlier is on display at the University of Edinburgh in Scotland. It's unknown as to how the university acquired the piece or where it originated. Photos of its pages show that, while its original binding is lost, the pages are still in remarkable condition, their colors still vibrant and words legible.

The Missal of Silos is the oldest known surviving paper document (as opposed to parchment) of European origin in existence today, dating back to at least 1080. It was made by the monastery at the Santa María la Real of Nájera.

=== 15th century ===
The Wakoklon Heelel Thilen Salai Amailon Pukok Puya, shortly known as the "Wakoklon", is one of the oldest scriptures (puyas) in Sanamahism, the Meetei religion of Ancient Kangleipak (Antique Manipur). The genealogy of the text indicates 1398 BC (3400 years ago) as the date of origins, while the oldest surviving physical document is from the 15th century AD. The text is considered by the people and the Government of Manipur as the source of the Kanglei Eeyek (Meetei script).

== See also ==
- Ancient literature#Incomplete list of ancient texts
- Ancient text corpora
