= Mahmood Bijankhan =

Iranian linguist

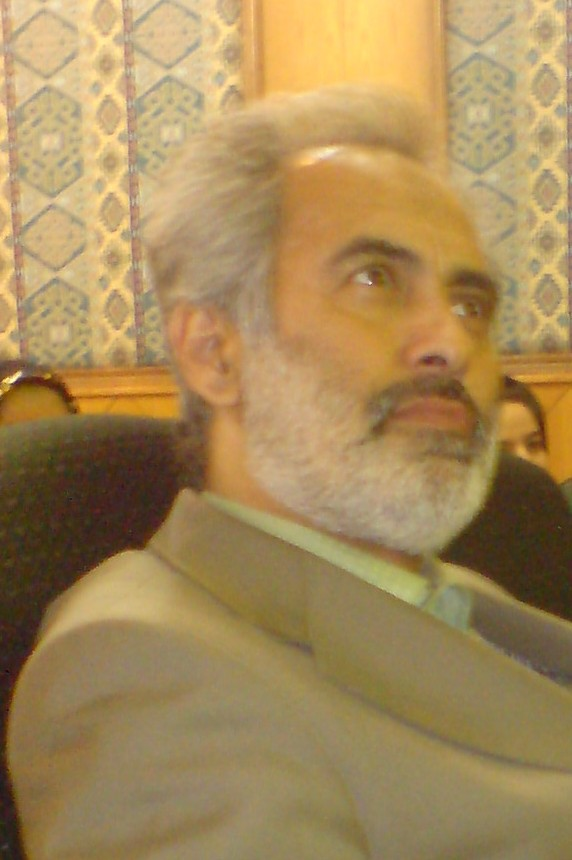
- Born: 1958 (age 67–68); Abadan, Iran
- Awards: Khwarizmi International Award

Academic background
- Education: University of Tehran, University of Texas at Arlington

Academic work
- Main interests: Phonology, Phonetics, Corpus linguistics

Mahmoud Bijankhan (Persian: محمود بی‌جن‌خان; born 1958 in Abadan) is an Iranian linguist and professor of linguistics at the University of Tehran. He is the creator of Bijankhan Corpus and a winner of Khwarizmi International Award. Bijankhan received his BSc in applied mathematics from the University of Texas at Arlington (1981) and his MA (1990) and PhD (1996) in linguistics from the University of Tehran. He is known for his research on Persian phonetics and phonology and creating Persian corpora.

== Books ==
- Phonology: Optimality Theory, Tehran: SAMT, 2006
- A Feasibility Study for Analysis of Ezafe in Persian Using Pattern Matching, Tehran: Research Center for Culture, Art and Communication, 2008
- Persian Language and Computers (ed.), Tehran: SAMT, 2011
- Frequency Dictionary, Tehran: University of Tehran Press, 2013
- Phonetic System of the Persian Language, Tehran: SAMT, 2014

== See also ==
- Bijankhan Corpus
