= Ancient text corpora =

All known writing up to 300 CE

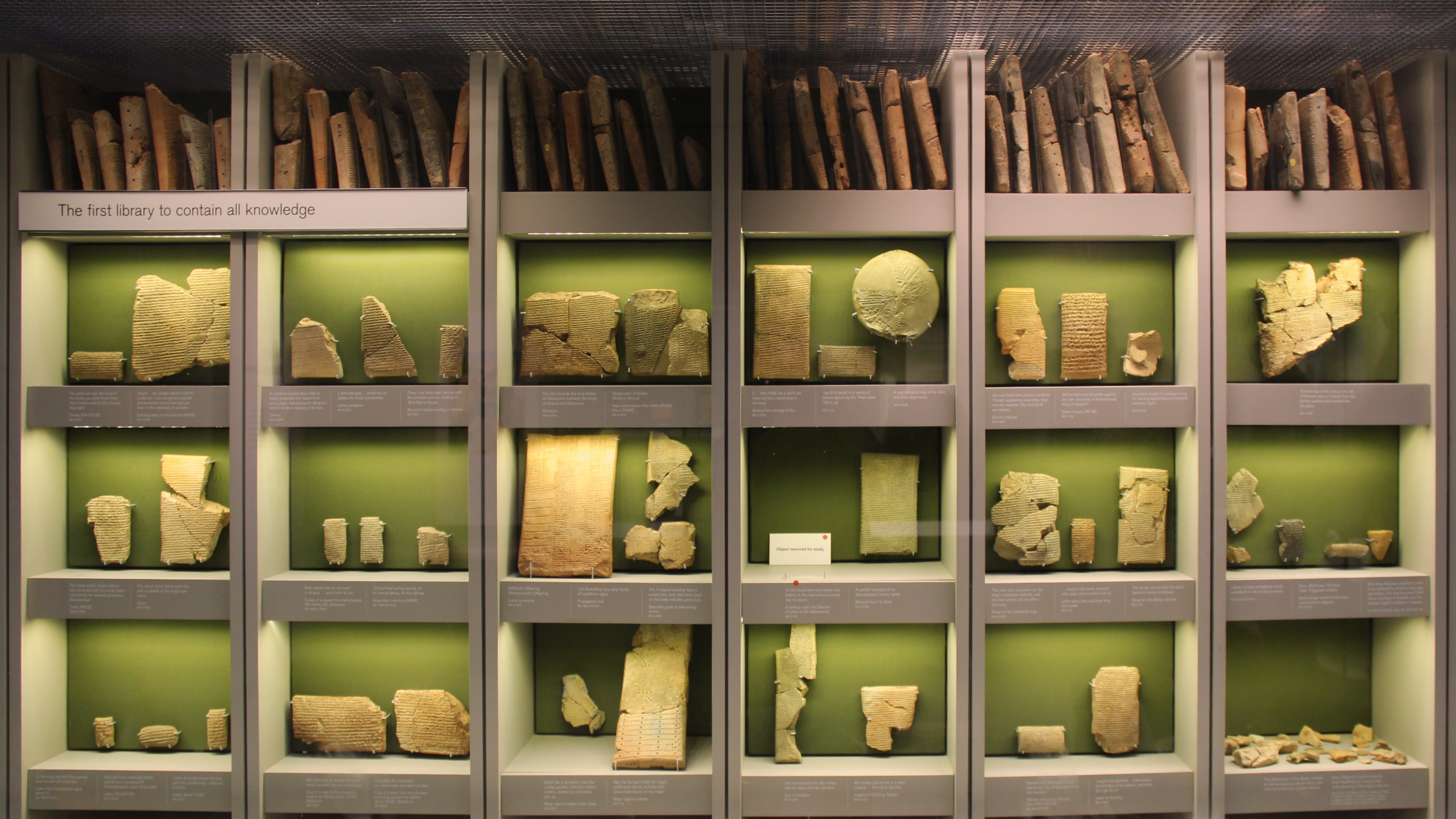
An exhibit of part of the Library of Ashurbanipal, one of the largest components of the Akkadian corpus

Ancient text corpora are the entire collection of texts from the period of ancient history, defined in this article as the period from the beginning of writing up to 300 AD. These corpora are important for the study of literature, history, linguistics, and other fields, and are a fundamental component of the world's cultural heritage.

Chinese, Latin, and Greek are examples of ancient languages with significant text corpora, although much of these corpora are known to us via transmission (frequently via medieval manuscript copies) rather than in their original form. These texts – both transmitted and original – provide valuable insights into the history and culture of different regions of the world, and have been studied for centuries by scholars and researchers. Other ancient texts – particularly stone inscriptions and papyrus scrolls – have been published following archaeological research, notably the cuneiform corpus of c. 10 million words and the c. 5 million words in ancient Egyptian.

Through advances in technology and digitization, ancient text corpora are more accessible than ever before. Tools such as the Perseus Digital Library and the Digital Corpus of Sanskrit have made it easier for researchers to access and analyze these texts.

== Quantifying the corpora ==
Two types of ancient texts are known to modern scholars – those that have only survived in younger manuscripts, but whose great age is undisputed (this applies to the bulk of the Chinese, Brahmi, Greek, Latin, Hebrew and Avestan tradition), and those known from original inscriptions, papyri and other manuscripts.

Counting of the words in each corpus presents significant methodological challenges – in principle, every single occurrence of a word in the text is counted separately, but in the case of parallel transmission of literary texts, only a single transmission is taken into account. Just as the Book of the Dead and the coffin texts are only included once in the number given for the Egyptian, the Greek and Latin literary works should only be counted according to one manuscript. If, on the other hand, tombs, royal inscriptions or economic documents of certain ancient languages often show a more or less identical form, this is not evaluated as a purely "parallel tradition". Attached prepositions are counted as separate words, except in the case of the definite article in Hebrew, Aramaic and Greek since it has no equivalent in most languages, so its frequency would significantly affect the comparability of numbers.

=== Languages with known size estimates ===
Script	Language	Dates used	Number of texts prior to 300 AD	Number of words prior to 300 AD			Ref.
Script	Language	Dates used	Number of texts prior to 300 AD	Archaeological	Transmission	Total	Ref.
Egyptian hieroglyphs / Hieratic	Egyptian			5,000,000	none	5,000,000	
Demotic	Egyptian			1,000,000	none	1,000,000	
Greek (Ancient Greek literature, New Testament, Church Fathers, etc.)						57,000,000	
Latin						10,000,000	
Cuneiform	Akkadian		144,000	9,900,000	none	9,900,000	
Cuneiform	Sumerian		102,300	3,076,000	none	3,076,000	
Cuneiform	Hurrian			12,500	none	12,500	
Cuneiform	Urartian		400	10,000	none	10,000	
Cuneiform	Hittite			700,000	none	700,000	
Cuneiform	Hattic			500	none	500	
Cuneiform	Cuneiform Luwian			3000	none	3000	
Cuneiform	Elamite		2,087	100,000	none	100,000	
Cuneiform	Protoelamic		1,435	20,000	none	20,000	
Cuneiform	Eblaite		16,000	300,000	none	300,000	
Cuneiform	Amorite		7,000	11,600	none	11,600	
Cuneiform	Ugaritic			40,000	none	40,000	
Cuneiform	Old Persian			7,000	100,000	107,000	
Canaanite and Aramaic	Ancient Hebrew (inc. Hebrew Bible)			35,000	265,000	300,000	
Canaanite and Aramaic	Aramaic (ancient, imperial, biblical, Hasmonean, Nabataean, Palmyrene)					100,000	
Canaanite and Aramaic	Phoenician/Punic		10,000		68		
Anatolian hieroglyphs (Luwian)			250+				
Old South Arabian			10,500	112,500	none	112,500	
Etruscan				25,000		25,000	

=== South Asian ===
- Sanskrit (Vedic Sanskrit and Classical Sanskrit)
- Indus script (3,800 items, c.20,000 characters)
- Brahmi script
- Old Tamil
- Early Indian epigraphy and Indian epic poetry
- Kharosthi
- Pali literature
- List of historic Indian texts

The size of the Vedic Sanskrit corpus was estimated to be 3 million words.

The size of the Tiptaka, written in Pali was estimated to be 2.7 million words.

=== Mesoamerican ===
- Olmec hieroglyphs
- Maya script

=== East Asian ===
- Old Chinese
- Chinese classics
  - The pre-Qin corpus: a collection of ancient Chinese texts written before the Qin dynasty (221 BC). The corpus includes texts from Confucianism, Taoism, Legalism, and other schools of thought.
  - The pre-Han corpus: a collection of ancient Chinese texts written before the Han dynasty (202 BC). The corpus includes texts from Confucianism, Taoism, Legalism, and other schools of thought.
  - See the Chinese Text Project
  - Chinese bronze inscriptions, Oracle bone script, Seal script, Clerical script

The existent body of pre-220.a.d. traditional Chinese texts was estimated to be 8 million characters.

=== Central Iranian languages ===
- Prior to 300 AD, the Central Iranian languages are mainly in the form of Sassanid stone inscriptions in the two closely related idioms Middle Persian (Pahlavi scripts and Inscriptional Parthian), there are 5000 for the corpus of Middle Persian (mostly 3rd, but also 4th/5th centuries) and for the corpus of Parthian (3rd century) 3000 words. To what extent some of the Manichaean Middle Persian literary texts may date back to the 3rd century is difficult to estimate; Mani is said to have personally written the Shabuhragan totaling about 5000 words. In any case, if we combine Middle Persian and Parthian, we come to over 10,000 words.

=== Middle-East ===
- Proto-Sinaitic script has no more than about 400 letters (number of words is unknown since the script has not been fully interpreted). To a similar extent, there are probably approximately contemporaneous Proto-Canaanite inscriptions (ibid.).
- The Byblos syllabary corpus is about 1100 glyphs long and is currently considered undeciphered. It directly preceded the Phoenician alphabet (which is also thought to have originated and spread from Byblos).

=== Anatolian ===
- Luwian cuneiform, approx. 3000 words
- the Palaic language few hundred words.
- the Lycian alphabet (the best attested Anatolian successor language written in alphabetic script) with about 5000 words
- The Lydian alphabet 109 inscriptions comprising about 1500 words
- The Phrygian alphabet the in-tomb inscriptions from the 2nd and 3rd centuries AD (approx. 1000 words) and in the so-called "old Phrygian" inscriptions less than 300 words
- The Carian alphabets whose texts, mainly from Egypt, contain around 600 words.

=== Old Italic ===
- the Umbrian language attested essentially by the sacrificial instructions of the Iguvinian Tables with 5000 words
- the Oscan language (ibid.) with 2000 words
- the Messapic language with probably a good 1000 words (the estimate is difficult because most texts in this hardly understandable language do not use word separators)
- the Venetic language a few hundred words
- the Faliscan language a few hundred words
- Cisalpine Celtic inscriptions amount to approximately 2000 words, to which are added a number of glosses by classical authors

=== Iberia ===
- Iberian scripts, more rarely written in Greek or Latin script, approx. 2500 words
- Celtiberian script, which refers to Celtic language testimonies in Iberian, but also in Latin script from Spain (approx. 1000 words)
- Southwest Paleohispanic script, 78 inscriptions, a few hundred words
- Lusitanian language, three monuments in Latin script, approx. 60 words

=== Germanic Northern Europe ===
- Runic inscriptions dated before the 4th century amount to about 30 pieces, which contain no more than 50 words in total

=== Africa ===
- Geʽez script: comparatively few inscriptions with a total of around 1,000 words before 300 AD. Following Christianization in the 4th century, more extensive texts are known.
- Libyco-Berber alphabet: over 1,000 inscriptions from the Maghreb, which are dated to Roman times. Most texts do not use a word separator; Peust estimates that the total number of words could be around 5,000
- Meroitic script (Ancient Nubian): about 900 texts are known, which Peust estimates may contain approximately 10,000 words, albeit with uncertainty from the fact that the word separator is not used consistently in the Meroitic script.

=== Aegean ===
- The Cretan Linear A inscriptions that have not yet been deciphered are available in about 2500 texts, which contain a total of around 20,000 characters. The total number of words can hardly be determined; Peust tentatively put it in the same order of magnitude as in Meroitic.
- In addition to the Linear A texts, there are also inscriptions Cretan hieroglyphs of a few hundred characters and texts written in the Greek alphabet, but not in Greek, with a few dozen words
- Cypriot syllabary in the first millennium BC, in which mostly Greek texts were recorded. The relevant texts comprise around 100 to 200 words.

=== Micro corpora ===
There are a significant number of ancient micro-corpus languages. Estimating the total number of attested ancient languages may be as difficult as estimating their corpus size. For example, Greek and Latin sources hand down an enormous amount of foreign-language glosses, the seriousness of which is not always certain.

== Preservation and curation ==
Historic preservation and maintaining ancient text corpora presents several challenges, including issues with preservation, translation, and digitization. Many ancient texts have been lost over time, and those that survive may be damaged or fragmented. Translating ancient languages and scripts requires specialized expertise, and digitizing texts can be time-consuming and resource-intensive.

== Corpus linguistics ==
The field of corpus linguistics studies language as expressed in text corpora. This includes the analysis of word frequency, collocations, grammar, and semantics. Ancient text corpora provide a valuable resource for corpus linguistics research, enabling scholars to explore the evolution of language and culture over time.

== See also ==
- List of languages by first written account
- List of text corpora
- List of oldest documents
- Ancient literature

== Bibliography ==
- Peust, Carsten (2000). "Über ägyptische Lexikographie. 1: Zum Ptolemaic Lexikon von Penelope Wilson; 2: Versuch eines quantitativen Vergleichs der Textkorpora antiker Sprachen". Lingua Aegyptia 7 (PDF). pp. 245–260.
- Streck, Michael P. (2010). "Großes Fach Altorientalistik. Der Umfang des keilschriftlichen Textkorpus". Mitteilungen der Deutschen Orientgesellschaft 142 (PDF). pp. 35–58.
- Hawkins, John David [in German] (2000). Corpus of Hieroglyphic Luwian Inscriptions, Volume 1, Inscriptions of the Iron Age: Part 1: Text, Introduction, Karatepe, Karkamis, Tell Ahmar, Maras, Malatya, Commagene. Part 2: Text, Amuq, Aleppo, Hama, Tabal, Assur Letters, Miscellaneous, Seals, Indices. Part 3: Plates. Berlin and New York: Walter de Gruyter. doi:10.1515/9783110804201. ISBN 978-3-11-010864-4.
- Hawkins, John David (2024-02-19). Corpus of Hieroglyphic Luwian Inscriptions: Volume III: Inscriptions of the Hittite Empire and New Inscriptions of the Iron Age. De Gruyter. doi:10.1515/9783110778854. ISBN 978-3-11-077885-4.
