= TenTen Corpus Family =

The TenTen Corpus Family (also called TenTen corpora) is a set of comparable web text corpora, i.e. collections of texts that have been crawled from the World Wide Web and processed to match the same standards. These corpora are made available through the Sketch Engine corpus manager. There are TenTen corpora for more than 35 languages. Their target size is 10 billion (10^{10}) words per language, which gave rise to the corpus family's name.

In the creation of the TenTen corpora, data crawled from the World Wide Web are processed with natural language processing tools developed by the Natural Language Processing Centre at the Faculty of Informatics at Masaryk University (Brno, Czech Republic) and by the Lexical Computing company (developer of the Sketch Engine).

== Corpus linguistics ==
In corpus linguistics, a text corpus is a large and structured collection of texts that are electronically stored and processed. It is used to do hypothesis testing about languages, validating linguistic rules or the frequency distribution of words (n-grams) within languages.

Electronically processed corpora provide fast search. Text processing procedures such as tokenization, part-of-speech tagging and word-sense disambiguation enrich corpus texts with detailed linguistic information. This enables to narrow the search to a particular parts of speech, word sequences or a specific part of the corpus.

First text corpora were created in the 1960s, such as the 1-million-word Brown Corpus of American English. Over time, many further corpora were produced (such as the British National Corpus and the LOB Corpus) and work had begun also on corpora of larger sizes and covering other languages than English. This development was linked with the emergence of corpus creation tools that help achieve larger size, wider coverage, cleaner data etc.

== Production of TenTen corpora ==
The procedure by which TenTen corpora are produced is based on the creators' earlier research in preparing web corpora and the subsequent processing thereof.

At the beginning, a huge amount of text data is downloaded from the World Wide Web by the dedicated SpiderLing web crawler. In a later stage, these texts undergo cleaning, which consists of removing any non-textual material such as navigation links, headers and footers from the HTML source code of web pages with the jusText tool, so that only full solid sentences are preserved. Eventually, the ONION tool is applied to remove duplicate text portions from the corpus, which naturally occur on the World Wide Web due to practices such as quoting, citing, copying etc.

== TenTen corpora data structure ==
TenTen corpora follow a specific metadata structure that is common to all of them. Metadata is contained in structural attributes that relate to individual documents and paragraphs in the corpus. Some TenTen corpora can feature additional specific attributes.

=== Document attributes ===
- top-level domain – domain at the highest level of the hierarchical Domain Name System (e.g. "com")
- website – identification string defining a realm of administrative autonomy within the Internet (e.g. "wikipedia.org")
- web domain – collection of related web pages (e.g. "la.wikipedia.org")
- crawl date – date when the document was downloaded from the Web
- url – the Uniform Resource Locator referring to the document's source
- wordcount – number of words in the document
- length – classification of the document into a range by its length measured in thousands of words

=== Paragraph attributes ===
- heading – a numeric attribute distinguishing headers and similar titles from ordinary body text (1 if the paragraph is a heading, 0 otherwise)

== Available TenTen corpora ==
The following corpora can be accessed through the Sketch Engine as of October 2018:

1. arTenTen (Arabic web corpus)
2. beTenTen (Belarusian web corpus)
3. bgTenTen (Bulgarian web corpus)
4. caTenTen (Catalan web corpus)
5. csTenTen (Czech web corpus)
6. daTenTen (Danish web corpus)
7. deTenTen (German web corpus)
8. elTenTen (Greek web corpus)
9. enTenTen (English web corpus)
10. esTenTen (Spanish web corpus with European/American Spanish subcorpora)
11. etTenTen (Estonian web corpus)
12. fiTenTen (Finnish web corpus)
13. frTenTen (French web corpus)
14. heTenTen (Hebrew web corpus)
15. hiTenTen (Hindi web corpus)
16. huTenTen (Hungarian web corpus)
17. itTenTen (Italian web corpus)
18. jaTenTen (Japanese web corpus)
19. kmTenTen (Khmer web corpus)
20. koTenTen (Korean web corpus)
21. loTenTen (Lao & Isan web corpus)
22. ltTenTen (Lithuanian web corpus)
23. lvTenTen (Latvian web corpus)
24. mkTenTen (Macedonian web corpus)
25. nlTenTen (Dutch web corpus)
26. noTenTen (Norwegian web corpus)
27. plTenTen (Polish web corpus)
28. ptTenTen (Portuguese web corpus)
29. roTenTen (Romanian web corpus)
30. ruTenTen (Russian web corpus)
31. skTenTen (Slovak web corpus)
32. slTenTen (Slovenian web corpus)
33. svTenTen (Swedish web corpus)
34. thTenTen (Thai web corpus)
35. tlTenTen (Tagalog web corpus)
36. trTenTen (Turkish web corpus)
37. ukTenTen (Ukrainian web corpus)
38. zhTenTen (Chinese Simplified characters web corpus)

== See also ==
- Text corpus
- Sketch Engine
- Web crawler (spider)
- Data deduplication
