= General Internet Corpus of Russian =

- Website type: Educational/scientific project
- Available in: Russian language
- Creators: Vladimir Selegey, Vladimir Belikov, Serge Sharoff
- Website: www.webcorpora.ru/en
- Commercial: No
- Registration: Needed; given by request
- Launched: 2012
- Current status: Beta-testing

General Internet Corpus of Russian (GICR) is a corpus of Russian internet texts that has been accessible on request through an online query interface since 2013. The corpus includes rich text materials from the blogosphere, social networks, major news sources and literary magazines.

== Goals of the project ==
The project has the status of an educational and scientific one, and many tasks of computational linguistics are solved by independent researchers and research groups with the materials obtained by GICR. While other corpus projects of Russian are focused on fiction and edited texts, General Internet Corpus provides linguists timely opportunity to learn the language as it is, with all the slang and regional peculiarities.

Corpus gives the opportunity to carry out research in

- Linguistic research of a wide range: dialectological research, study of word distribution, study of the language of the social networks, study of the influence of gender, age and other factors on the language, frequency of words, fixed expressions and different constructions, stylistic features of texts of different segments of the Internet, etc.
- Social media analysis
- Corpus-based machine learning for evaluating automatic tagging

At various times, student papers and independent researches were carried out on the project material by students, graduates and employees of MSU, MIPT, Russian State Humanitarian University, Novosibirsk State University, Higher School of Economics, Russian Academy of Sciences, SFU, CSU, SGMP, IAAS of MSU.

Scientific project leaders:

- Belikov V. - RSUH, Moscow, Russia
- Selegey V. - RSUH, ABBYY, Moscow, Russia
- Sharoff S. - RSUH, Moscow, Russia; University of Leeds, UK

The organizations involved in support of GICR:

- Russian State University of Humanities
- ABBYY Company
- Moscow Institute of Physics and Technology
- Skolkovo Institute of Science and Technology

== Size and content of the corpus ==
Corpus size for the summer 2016 is 19.8 billion tokens, of which 49% are from VKontakte, 40% are from LiveJournal, another 4% - from Mail.ru Blogs and News, and 2% - from Russian Magazine Hall. The sources collected in news segment are: RIA Novosti, Regnum, Lenta.ru, Rosbalt. Texts are provided with metamarkup (by date of creation of the text, sex, place and year of birth of the author, Internet genre, etc.); all texts are provided with automatic morphological tagging and lemmatization. Most of the texts collected are of 2013–2014 years of creation, although in some segments, such as in Russian Magazine Hall, there are some texts collected since 1994.

| Corpus segment | Words, millions | Documents |
|---|---|---|
| Mail.Ru Blogs | 707 | 9882120 |
| VKontakte | 9820 | 193770717 |
| Live Journal | 8110 | 73229158 |
| Russian Magazine Hall | 313 | 56547 |
| News (ria, regnum, lentaru, rosbalt) | 851 | 2964897 |
| All corpora | 19801 | 279903439 |

GICR is one of the few mega-corpora projects nowadays, which means its available size is reaching several billion of words.

| Corpus | Languages | Access | Site | Size | Facilities |
|---|---|---|---|---|---|
| COW: Free, Large Web Corpora in European Languages | English, French, German, Spanish, Swedish, Dutch | free, after registration, trial access is possible without registration | | 30 billion words | KWIC format, morphological tagging, CQP search, markup and search by date, URL, country, city, etc. |
| Sketch Engine | English, French, German, Italian, Arabic, Russian, Spanish, Portuguese, Korean, Japanese, Chinese + more languages available at extra charge | Paid access, trial access is possible after registration | | 86 billion words | concordances, sketch grammar, thesaurus, KWIC, morphological tagging, CQP search |
| Aranea Corpora | English, Russian, Finnish, French, German, Hungarian, Spanish, Italian, Dutch, Polish, Slovak | Free, after registration, trial access is possible without registration | | 14 billion words | noSketch Engine, concordances, sketch grammar, thesaurus, KWIC, morphological tagging, CQP search, comparable query results in different languages |
| GICR (General Internet Corpus of Russian) | Russian | Free, registration on request | | 20 billion words | concordances, thesaurus, KWIC, morphological tagging, CQP search, markup and search by date, country, city, internet-segment, sex, year and place of birth of the author, “query mail” for users. |
| GloWbE (Corpus of Global Web-Based English) | English, specification for 20 countries | No registration | | 1,9 billion words | KWIC, concordances, collocates, results comparable by dialects, CQP search, corpus can be downloaded |

== Access ==
Currently the interface of GICR is in beta stage, so access to the search in the corpora is provided and is free, but is available for researchers on request.

== See also ==
- Text corpus
- Corpus linguistics
- Russian National Corpus
- Internet linguistics
