= Adam Kilgarriff =

- Kilgarriff in June 2014
- Born: 12 February 1960; Hastings, East Sussex, United Kingdom
- Died: 16 May 2015 (aged 55); Brighton, East Sussex, United Kingdom
- Education: Cambridge University, University of Sussex
- Known for: Sketch Engine, word sketches
- Spouse: Gill Lamden
- Children: 3
- Scientific career
- Fields: corpus linguistics, computational linguistics, computer lexicography
- Workplaces: Lexical Computing Limited, University of Leeds
- Thesis: Polysemy (1992)
- Doctoral advisor: Gerald Gazdar, Roger Evans
- Website: kilgarriff.co.uk

Adam Kilgarriff (12 February 1960 – 16 May 2015) was a corpus linguist, lexicographer, and co-author of Sketch Engine.

== Life ==
His parents were booksellers. He spent one year as a volunteer in Kenya 1978–1979, then began studying at Cambridge University, graduating with a first-class BA degree in philosophy and engineering in 1982. His first job was as a Housing Officer for the London and Quadrant Housing Trust. At the same time, he studied at the South West London College. In 1987, he left his job and started an MSc in intelligent knowledge-based systems at the University of Sussex, from where he graduated the following year, continuing a DPhil in computational linguistics with thesis Polysemy (1992).

In 2008, he made a return trip to Kenya with his old friend Raphael. He was also a participant in the Hastings Half Marathon for many years.

In November 2014, he was diagnosed with stage 4 bowel cancer, which he succumbed to in May 2015. After the diagnosis he started his own blog where he reflected on his experience with the disease and thoughts on language, corpus linguistics and life, and the world in general.

== Adam Kilgarriff Prize ==
In 2016, the Adam Kilgarriff Prize was established in his honour; the biennial award recognises outstanding work in corpus linguistics, computational linguistics, and lexicography.

== Research and career ==
He graduated from University of Sussex (PhD, 1992) and became a lecturer at the University of Brighton in 1995. Later he was a visiting research fellow in Department of Informatics at the University of Sussex and in School of Modern languages and Cultures at the University of Leeds. The partnership with B.T.S. Atkins (Sue Atkins) and Michael Rundell brought setting up his first company Lexicography MasterClass Ltd in 2002. This company provided consultancy and training in lexicography and dictionary production. Shortly after the retirement of Sue Atkins, the company was dissolved in 2012. In 2003, he started his own company Lexical Computing Limited delivering tools and services in corpus processing. He himself has been working as a lexicographer for a short period (1992–1995) at the Longman Dictionaries.

His early research career was closely associated with word sense disambiguation (PhD thesis above). Kilgarriff argued against discrete classification of word senses and saw word senses rather as a continuous space of meanings largely defined by the contexts in which a word appears. His paper "I don't believe in word senses" (1997) became soon a state-of-the-art argumentation on the topic.

The work on polysemy brought Kilgarriff to text corpora and corpus linguistics to which he devoted the rest of his career. He was one of the founding members and former chair (2006–2008) of the Special Interest Group on Web as Corpus (SIGWAC) of the Association for Computational Linguistics (ACL) and also one of the founding organizers of SENSEVAL. In the years 2000–2004, he was the president of the Special Interest Group on the Lexicon (SIGLEX) of the ACL. Kilgarriff was an active member of the European Association for Lexicography (member of board 2002–2006), consultant for major publishing houses and reviewer for journals and conferences around that field.

He has been working on methods for automatic acquisition of large web corpora and quantitative and qualitative corpus analysis (text genres, corpus similarity, homogeneity and heterogeneity). His work on corpora was closely connected with their application for computer lexicography.

Kilgarriff invented the notion of word sketches, one-page summaries of a word's collocation behaviour in particular grammatical relations, which represent the core part of the Sketch Engine corpus management system.
