= Xaira =

Xaira is an XML Aware Indexing and Retrieval Architecture developed at Oxford University, it was funded by the Mellon Foundation between 2005 and 2006. It is based on SARA, an SGML-aware text-searching system originally developed for searching the British National Corpus. Xaira has been redeveloped as a generic XML system for constructing query-systems for any kind of XML data, in particular for use with TEI. The current Windows implementation is intended for non-specialist users. A more sophisticated and open-source version is currently under development. This version supports cross-platform working using standards such as XML-RPC and SOAP.

== See also ==
- Corpus linguistics
- Lemmatisation
