= XCES =

XCES is an XML based standard to encode text corpora, which are used by linguists and natural language researchers. XCES is highly based on the previous EAGLES Corpus Encoding Standard (CES) but uses XML as the markup language. It supports simple corpora as well as annotated corpora, parallel corpora and other.

== See also ==
- Text Encoding Initiative
