= Russian National Corpus =

Database of Russian texts

The Russian National Corpus (Russian: Национальный корпус русского языка, lit. 'National Corpus of the Russian Language') is a corpus of the Russian language that has been partially accessible through a query interface online since April 29, 2004. It is being created by the Institute of Russian Language, Russian Academy of Sciences.

It currently contains more than 1 billion word forms that are automatically lemmatized and POS-/grammeme-tagged, i.e. all the possible morphological analyses for each orthographic form are ascribed to it. Lemmata, POS, grammatical items, and their combinations are searchable. Additionally, 6 million word forms are in the subcorpus with manually resolved homonymy.

The subcorpus with resolved morphological homonymy is also automatically accentuated. The whole corpus has a searchable tagging concerning lexical semantics (LS), including morphosemantic POS subclasses (proper noun, reflexive pronoun etc.), LS characteristics proper (thematic class, causativity, evaluation), derivation (diminutive, adverb formed from adjective etc.).

The RNC includes also the following subcorpora:

- a treebank of syntactical dependencies (largely based on the Igor Mel'čuk's Meaning-Text Theory)
- English⇔Russian, German⇒Russian, Ukrainian⇔Russian and Belorussian⇔Russian parallel corpora;
- a large (100+ million words) separate corpus of modern newspapers (2001–2011);
- a corpus of Russian poetry, where the rhyming words and poetic prosody (including meter, stanzas etc.) is additionally tagged;
- a corpus of Russian dialects with specific dialect grammar tagging;
- a multimedia corpus with searchable tagged fragments of Russian-language movies;
- a corpus showing the history of Russian stress
- an educational subcorpus reflecting school standards.

All the texts have tags bearing metatextual information - the author, his/her birth date, creation date, text size, text genres (general fiction, detective story, newspaper article etc.); All these categories are browsable and searchable separately. It is possible to define a user's subcorpus to search lemmata/POS-grammeme/semantic tags combinations only within this subset.

== See also ==
- General Internet Corpus of Russian
