= AsoSoft text corpus =

Kurdish text corpus

The AsoSoft text corpus is the first large-scale Kurdish text corpus, collected and processed by the AsoSoft research and development group. It contains 458,000 documents (188 million tokens) that are collected from sources such as websites, news agencies, books, and magazines. The corpus is partially tagged by topic, so it can be used for topic identification tasks. Also, it is applicable for extracting language model and computational lexicon information. Part of the corpus (75 million tokens) is available online for non-commercial use. The corpus uses the TEI format.
