= English language institute =

Education department

An English language institute (ELIs) or English language center (ELCs) is a department within a college or university in English-speaking countries that aims to develop students' English language skills for a variety of purposes. In countries like New Zealand, ELCs accounted for one-fifth of the NZ$1.1 billion in revenue (2001).

Many schools began their department to provide English for academic purposes (EAP) programming to support the needs of the respective schools to meet the school's necessary English language requirements for admission and increase international student enrollment to include students with English as a second or foreign language. Steadily, many ELIs have grown in recent years to support institutional missions for increased efforts for internationalization as well as revenue generation.

== Types of English language programs ==
Increasingly, ELIs have grown to provide a variety of program and service offerings including:

- English for academic purposes (EAP)
- Discipline-specific English language provision, such as Business English, English for the sciences, English for medical professionals
- General English: learning English for conversation and non-academic purposes
- English language testing services, such as IELTS or TOEFL provision
- Teaching English as an additional language training

To meet the traditional needs of English language learners, many ELIs have adopted or partnered with international student services on their campus to provide sociocultural integration, language acquisition, academic and career preparedness, and immigration support.

== Staff ==
ELIs consist of a variety of staff representing a variety of areas within their department, including:

- Instructors: teachers who possess a teaching certification of some form for teaching English to speakers of other languages (TESOL). Most instructors possess an undergraduate or graduate degree in areas of the humanities, including linguistics, social studies, literature, philosophy, modern languages, or history, and will subsequently have had to master specialist TESOL subject areas.
- Professional development: as many TESOL certifications require ongoing professional development annually in order to maintain accreditation, typically most departments have staff whose full load or partial load responsibility involve coordinating professional development opportunities for English language instructors and staff.
- Marketing and recruitment: recognizing that many ELIs are considered high revenue generators for their respective institutions, many departments have a complement of marketing and recruitment staff who travel internationally or work with agents to recruit English language learners to their institution.
- Student experience and activities: staff are designated to support in coordinating co-curricular programming to support English language learners in their language development outside of the classroom, transitional support to Canadian life, and experience life in Canada through a variety of activities. Many staff members also provide advising support, including university/college application assistance.
- Administrative support: administrative support in ELIs help to generate letters of acceptance for English language learners to apply for their respective study permits/visas, response to front-line inquiries, and also coordinate administrative support for agents.
- Administration: administration in an ELI helps to oversee curriculum for its respective language programs to ensure it meets the necessary language requirements, such as the Common European Framework of Reference.
- Homestay/Housing professionals: these individuals help to coordinate accommodations for the English language learners during their studies. Many ELIs decide to outsource this service to many local homestay organizations in their specific region.

== Accreditation bodies for ELIs ==
Many ELIs and ELCs belong to accreditation bodies that serve to maintain quality assurance of language programs offered. In Canada, Languages Canada serves as an accreditation organization for more than 210 language education programs in the country. In the United States, the Commission on English Language Program Accreditation serves to "promote excellence in the field of English language teaching and administration, as well as to protect the interests of students, through accreditation of English language programs and institutions worldwide".

Accreditation bodies frequently work to assess more than just curriculum in the programs, but in the case of Languages Canada, also examines quality in areas related to student services, teaching staff, marketing and promotion, administration, and student admissions processes.
