= Celtic Psalter =

11th century psalter

- Edinburgh University Library MS 56
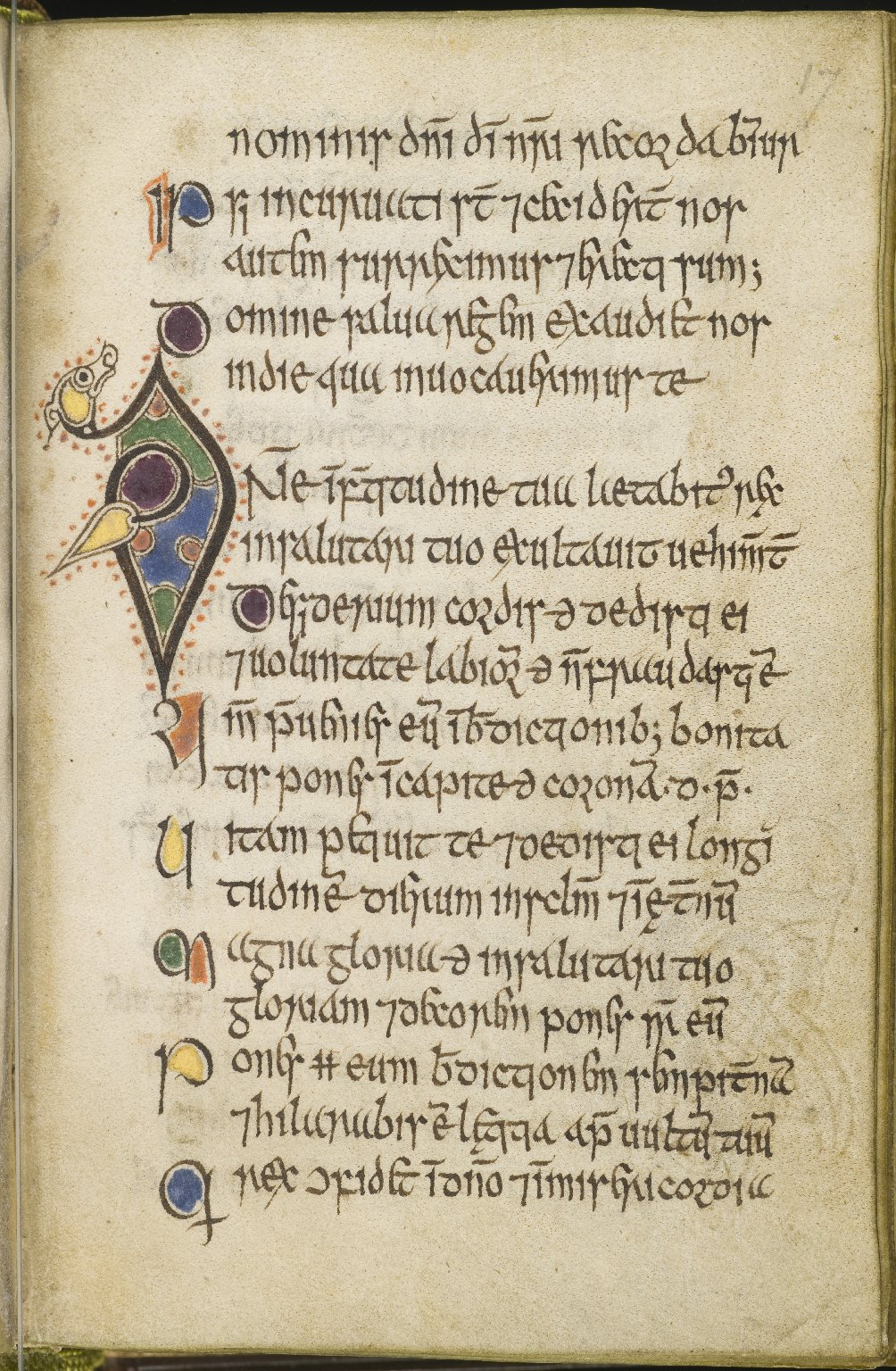
- f.17r of Celtic Psalter
- Also known as: Psalter (Celtic)
- Date: c. 1000 CE
- Language: Latin
- Material: vellum
- Size: 13.02 cm x 7.94 cm
- Condition: no original binding; some missing and replaced pages; pages cropped

The Celtic Psalter (Edinburgh University Library MS 56) is a 114-page, 11th-century psalter and is likely to be the oldest Scottish book to be still kept within Scotland.

Its exact origins are unknown, however it is similar to books made in Irish and Scottish monasteries at the time, which strongly suggests it was produced somewhere within Scotland, possibly by monks in a monastery in Iona.

== Contents ==
Many bindings for the book have been made over time as the original has long since been lost. The current binding was created by Douglas Cockerell in 1914 in Celtic style.

== History ==
The book is dated sometime in the early 1000s or perhaps earlier. Analysis of gold pigment by A.P. Laurie on one of the pages shows it contains river-washed gold dust which has at latest been found in the Canterbury psalter in the early 1000s and is absent past the 11th century. The earliest owner known of the manuscript is John Reid, chancellor of Aberdeen, in 1537, who has left an inscription within. There are no other marks of ownership apart from an erased inscription on the first page. It was then acquired by the University of Edinburgh library at some point before 1636 as shown by a manuscript catalogue of that date.

A common rumour is that the book was commissioned for Saint Margaret of Scotland as a love token by Malcolm III since the book has been dated to around that period.
