= Oxford University Phonetics Lab =

English research laboratory

Coordinates: 51.7572°N 1.2628°W

Location of The Oxford University Phonetics Laboratory within central Oxford

The Phonetics Laboratory is the phonetics laboratory at the University of Oxford, England. It is located at 41 Wellington Square, Oxford.

The laboratory focuses on experimental tests of linguistic assumptions and empirical linguistics. It provides teaching at the undergraduate and graduate level. Research students in the laboratory are normally reading for a higher degree in Experimental Linguistics, though students from other disciplines touching on the subject of speech are sometimes based in Phonetics.

The Phonetics Laboratory was established in 1980. It occupies the basement of 41 Wellington Square, a mid-Victorian brick building, expanded since. It has experimental areas (sound-insulated recording booths), and general experimental space. The lab also supports signal processing research via software, speech corpora, and processor clusters.

== Working Papers ==
The Phonetics Lab has published collections of working papers (ongoing research and research getting ready for peer-reviewed publication) since 1996. The 2009 Working Papers are titled "Papers in Phonetics and Computational Linguistics."
