= Kushim (Uruk period) =

Sumerian person, c. 3400–3000 BC

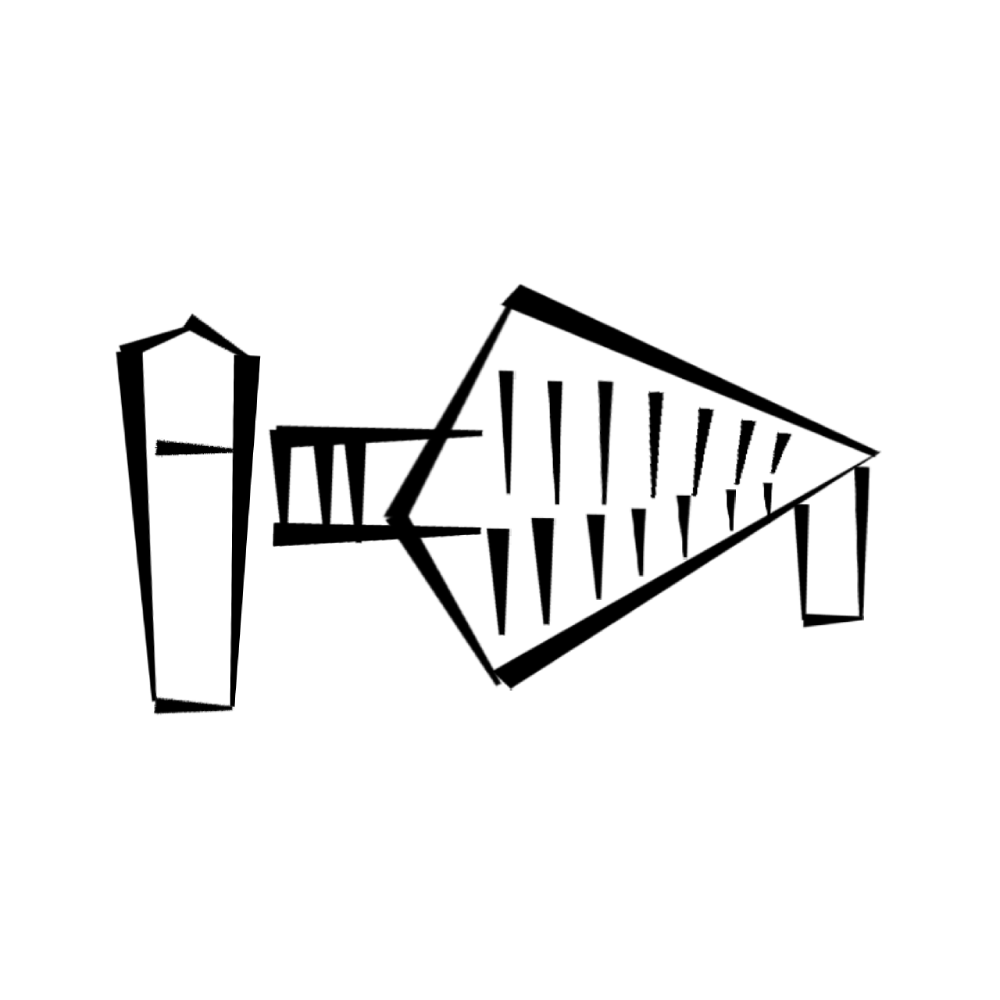
An illustration of the proto-cuneiform "Kushim" as seen on some ancient Sumerian clay tablets

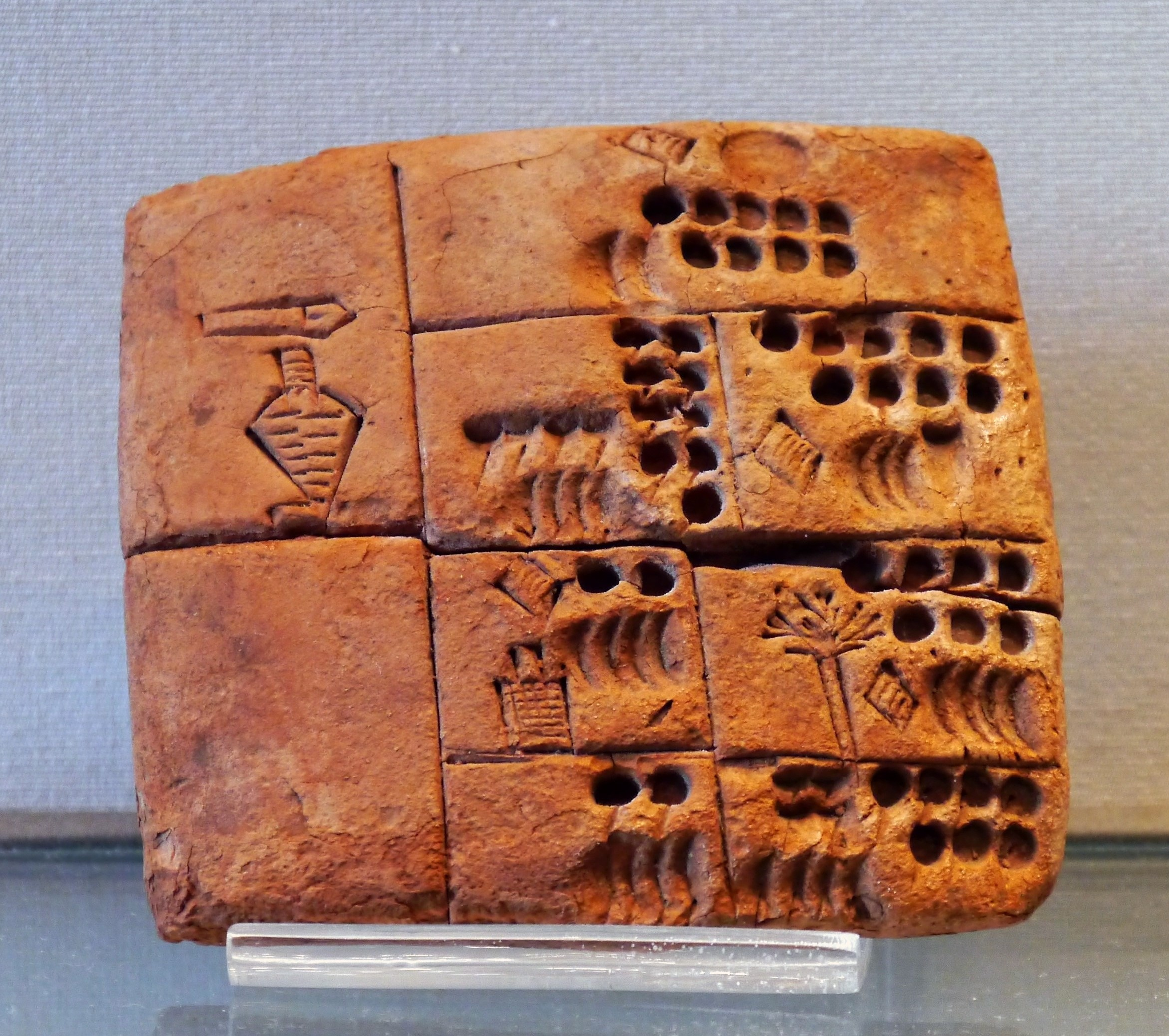
A Sumerian clay tablet potentially signed by Kushim in the upper left corner (not the more well-known "Kushim tablet")

Kushim (Sumerian: 𒆪𒋆 KU.ŠIM; fl. c. 3200 BC) is potentially the earliest-known recorded name of a person in writing. The name "Kushim" is found on several Uruk-period (c. 3400–3000 BC) clay tablets used to record transactions of barley. It is uncertain if the name refers to an individual, a generic title of an officeholder, or an institution.

== Uruk period tablets ==
Writing in ancient Sumer was a time-consuming activity known to few. For this reason, writing was mainly used to keep necessary economic records. Literacy in Uruk was also likely limited at the time. A clay tablet (MS 1717) detailing a trade transaction contains one of the first examples of rebus writing. It reads "28,086 (Note: Some sources give it as 29,086 measures; however, this is likely a transcription error since when the symbols are calculated, it comes out as 28,086 measures, approximately 135,000 litres.) measures barley 37 months Kushim." This may be interpreted as having been signed by "Kushim". As of 1993, Kushim's name was known to appear in 18 separate Proto-cuneiform clay tablets from the period.

Another Uruk period clay tablet that featured names dating back to around 3100 BC includes the names of a slave owner Gal-Sal and his two slaves, the man En-pap X and the woman Sukkalgir. This tablet was likely produced one or two generations after the Kushim tablet.

== Identity ==
Kushim is believed to have been either an individual or a generic title of an officeholder. The cuneiform characters "KU" and "ŠIM" were not presented with much context, and therefore it is difficult to determine whether such sign combinations denote a person, the person's office, or an entire institution. Kushim was responsible for the production and storage of barley. Some of the tablets charge the distribution of barley to several officials as various debits, with the summation on the reverse as a single credit for the discharge of Kushim's liability. One relatively simple account shows the charging of various amounts of barley to three officials on the obverse, while Kushim was credited for the total amount distributed to the officials on the reverse. However, the reverse could also be interpreted as Kushim's account. Other tablets are more intricate, showing the input of various ingredients on the obverse (malt, dates, etc.), while showing different kinds of beer as output on the reverse side. One tablet shows Kushim providing 14,712 litres of barley to four officials, for which they were properly discharged.

== See also ==
- History of accounting
- Iry-Hor, earliest historical figure known by name
- Enheduanna, possibly the oldest known author
- List of oldest documents
