= Hamshahri =

Iranian newspaper

- The front page of vol.1 & no.1
- Type: Daily newspaper
- Format: Broadsheet
- Owner: Municipality of Tehran
- Founder: Gholamhossein Karbaschi
- Publisher: Hamshahri Corp.
- Founded: 15 December 1992
- Language: Persian
- Headquarters: Tehran, Iran
- Circulation: 540,000 Daily (2015)
- Price: 5,000 Rial
- ISSN: 1735-6385
- Website: hamshahrionline.ir

Hamshahri (Persian: همشهری, lit. 'Fellow citizen'; Persian pronunciation: [hæmʃæhˈɾiː]) is a major Iranian national Persian-language newspaper in Tehran (whose municipal government owns the newspaper).

== History and profile ==
Hamshahri is published by the municipality of Tehran, and founded by Gholamhossein Karbaschi. It is the first coloured daily newspaper in Iran and has over 60 pages of classified advertisement. The newspaper is distributed within the limits of Tehran municipality. It has a daily circulation of over 400,000 copies, which is on par with major US-American daily newspapers such as the San Francisco Chronicle, Boston Globe, and Chicago Tribune. Based on the results of a domestic poll of how citizens of Tehran view television and print media which were released by Iran's Ministry of Culture and Islamic Guidance Hamshahri was the most read daily in Tehran with 44.1% in March 2014.

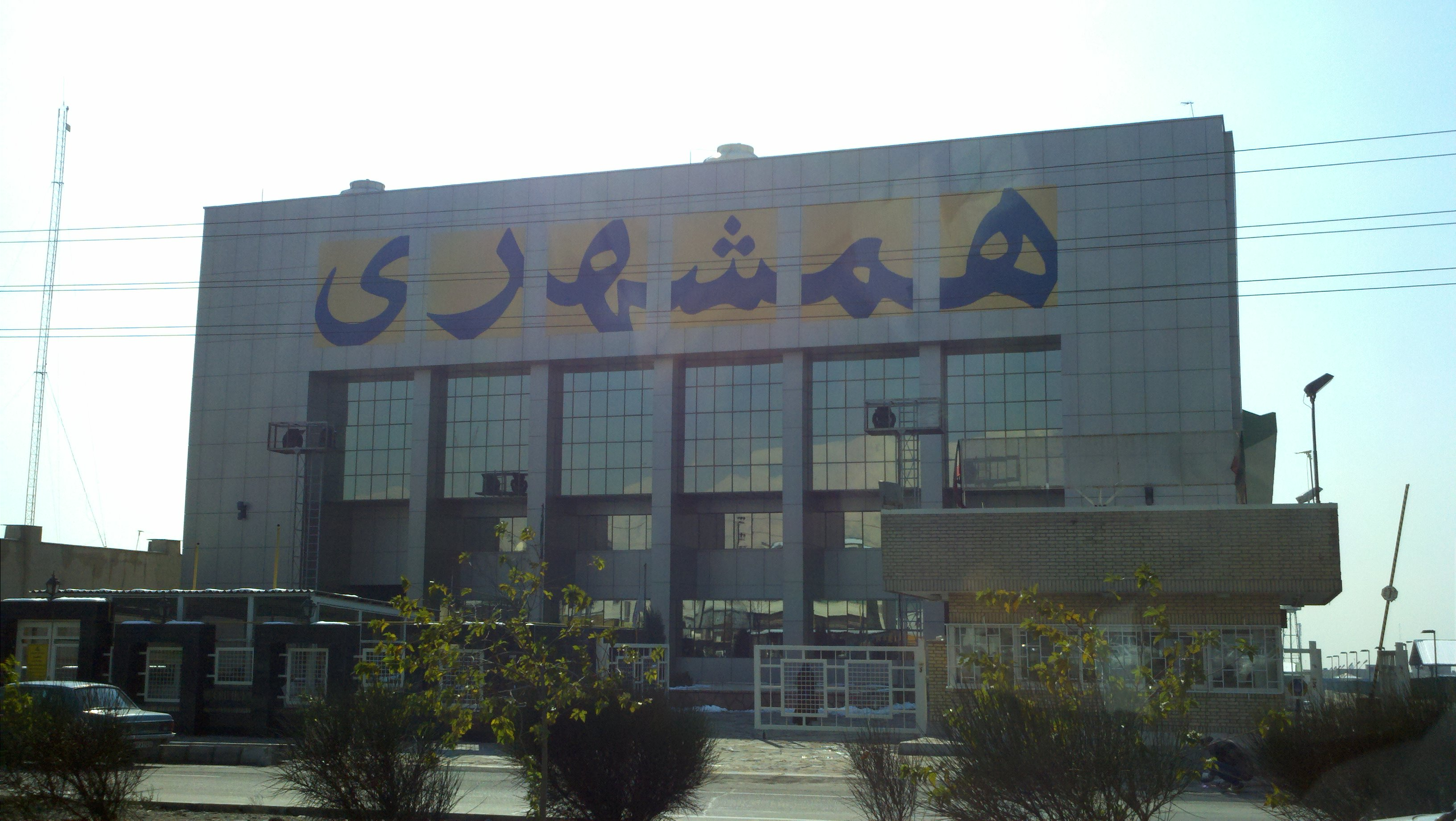
Hamshahri Building in Karaj-Tehran road.

In 1997's Iranian presidential election, Hamshahri newspaper, then run by former mayor of Tehran, Gholamhossein Karbaschi, was accused by conservatives of supporting Mohammad Khatami. This was seen as illegal, as papers receiving government subsidy were forbidden to take sides in the elections. The issue eventually led to Karbaschi being put on trial on grounds of embezzlement and was sentenced to time in prison. During Khatami's second term, Tehran press court ruled that the newspaper can only be distributed inside Tehran.

On 28 February 2026, the BBC reported that the Telegram channel of the hard-line Hamshahri daily claimed that several Iranian state-linked news and media outlets had been targeted by cyberattacks following the strikes on Iran by the US and Israel. According to the channel, the websites of IRNA and the semi-official ISNA (Iranian Students' News Agency) were reportedly hacked or experienced access issues.

== International Holocaust Cartoon Competition ==
On 6 February 2006, Farid Mortazavi, graphics editor of Hamshahri, announced the International Holocaust Cartoon Competition, a cartoon contest to denounce what it called 'Western hypocrisy on freedom of speech', alleging that "it is impossible in the West to joke upon or even discuss certain topics related to Judaism, such as the Holocaust, and the pretexts for the creation of Israel." The contest was created in response to the Jyllands-Posten Muhammad cartoons controversy and ended on 1 November 2006 with Abdellah Derkaoui, a Moroccan cartoonist, claiming the first prize. The event was denounced by United Nations Secretary-General Kofi Annan, the Israeli foreign ministry, Reporters Without Borders, the Anti-Defamation League and other parties.

== Temporary banning ==
The newspaper was temporarily banned from publication on 23–24 November 2009, after it published a picture from a temple of the Baháʼí Faith, which is an unrecognized religion in Iran, where its followers are subject to state sanctioned persecution.

== See also ==
- Hamshahri Corpus
- List of newspapers in Iran
- Mass media in Iran
- official instagram
