= Corpus of Contemporary American English =

Large text corpus of American English

The Corpus of Contemporary American English (COCA) is a one-billion-word corpus of contemporary American English. It was created by Mark Davies, retired professor of corpus linguistics at Brigham Young University (BYU).

== Content ==
The Corpus of Contemporary American English (COCA) is composed of one billion words as of November 2021. The corpus is constantly growing: In 2009 it contained more than 385 million words; in 2010 the corpus grew in size to 400 million words; by March 2019, the corpus had grown to 560 million words.

As of November 2021, the Corpus of Contemporary American English is composed of 485,202 texts. According to the corpus website, the current corpus (November 2021) is composed of texts that include 24-25 million words for each year 1990–2019.

For each year contained in the corpus (1990–2019), the corpus is evenly divided between six registers/genres: TV/movies, spoken, fiction, magazine, newspaper, and academic (see Texts and Registers page of the COCA website). In addition to the six registers that were previously listed, COCA (as of November 2021) also contains 125,496,215 words from blogs, and 129,899,426 from websites, making it a corpus that is truly composed of contemporary English (see Texts and Register page of COCA).

The texts come from a variety of sources:

- TV/Movies subtitles: (128 million words) Texts taken from the OpenSubtitles collection of American TV shows and movies.
- Spoken: (127 million words) Transcripts of unscripted conversation from nearly 150 TV and radio programs.
- Fiction: (120 million words) Short stories and plays, first chapters of books 1990–present, and movie scripts.
- Popular magazines: (127 million words) Nearly 100 magazines, from a range of domains such as news, health, home and gardening, women's, financial, religion, and sports.
- Newspapers: (123 million words) Ten newspapers from across the US, with text from different sections of the newspapers, such as local news, opinion, sports, and the financial section.
- Academic journals: (121 million words) Nearly 100 peer-reviewed journals. These were selected to cover the entire range of the Library of Congress Classification system.

== Queries ==
The Corpus of Contemporary American English is free to search for registered users.

- The interface is the same as the BYU-BNC interface for the 100 million word British National Corpus, the 100 million word Time Magazine Corpus, and the 400 million word Corpus of Historical American English (COHA), the 1810s–2000s (see links below)
- Queries by word, phrase, alternates, substring, part of speech, lemma, synonyms (see below), and customized lists (see below)
- The corpus is tagged by CLAWS, the same part of speech (PoS) tagger that was used for the BNC and the Time corpus
- Chart listings (totals for all matching forms in each genre or year, 1990–present, as well as for subgenres) and table listings (frequency for each matching form in each genre or year)
- Full collocates searching (up to ten words left and right of node word)
- Re-sortable concordances, showing the most common words/strings to the left and right of the searched word
- Comparisons between genres or time periods (e.g. collocates of 'chair' in fiction or academic, nouns with 'break the [N]' in newspapers or academic, adjectives that occur primarily in sports magazines, or verbs that are more common 2005–2010 than previously)
- One-step comparisons of collocates of related words, to study semantic or cultural differences between words (e.g. comparison of collocates of 'small', 'little', 'tiny', 'minuscule', and 'lilliputian', or 'Democrats' and 'Republicans', or 'men' and 'women', or 'rob' vs 'steal')
- Users can include semantic information from a 60,000 entry thesaurus directly as part of the query syntax (e.g. frequency and distribution of synonyms of 'beautiful', synonyms of 'strong' occurring in fiction but not academic, synonyms of 'clean' + noun ('clean the floor', 'washed the dishes'))
- Users can also create their own 'customized' word lists, and then re-use these as part of subsequent queries (e.g. lists related to a particular semantic category (clothes, foods, emotions), or a user-defined part of speech)
- Note that the corpus is available only through the web interface, due to copyright restrictions.

== See also ==
- American National Corpus
- British National Corpus
- Bank of English
- Brown Corpus
