= Automatic taxonomy construction =

Use of software programs to generate taxonomical classifications from a body of texts

Automatic taxonomy construction (ATC) is the use of software programs to generate taxonomical classifications from a body of texts called a corpus. ATC is a branch of natural language processing, which in turn is a branch of artificial intelligence.

A taxonomy (or taxonomical classification) is a scheme of classification, especially, a hierarchical classification, in which things are organized into groups or types. Among other things, a taxonomy can be used to organize and index knowledge (stored as documents, articles, videos, etc.), such as in the form of a library classification system, or a search engine taxonomy, so that users can more easily find the information they are searching for. Many taxonomies are hierarchies (and thus, have an intrinsic tree structure), but not all are.

Manually developing and maintaining a taxonomy is a labor-intensive task requiring significant time and resources, including familiarity of or expertise in the taxonomy's domain (scope, subject, or field), which drives the costs and limits the scope of such projects. Also, domain modelers have their own points of view which inevitably, even if unintentionally, work their way into the taxonomy. ATC uses artificial intelligence techniques to quickly automatically generate a taxonomy for a domain in order to avoid these problems and remove limitations.

== Approaches ==
There are several approaches to ATC. One approach is to use rules to detect patterns in the corpus and use those patterns to infer relations such as hyponymy. Other approaches use machine learning techniques such as Bayesian inferencing and Artificial Neural Networks.

=== Keyword extraction ===
One approach to building a taxonomy is to automatically gather the keywords from a domain using keyword extraction, then analyze the relationships between them (see Hyponymy, below), and then arrange them as a taxonomy based on those relationships.

=== Hyponymy and "is-a" relations ===
In ATC programs, one of the most important tasks is the discovery of hypernym and hyponym relations among words. One way to do that from a body of text is to search for certain phrases like "is a" and "such as". This pattern-based method originates with Marti Hearst, whose 1992 paper introduced a set of lexico-syntactic patterns — now known as "Hearst patterns" — for automatically acquiring hyponymy relations from large text corpora, using constructions such as "animals such as dogs" to learn that the second term is a kind of the first. Hearst patterns remain a foundational technique in automatic taxonomy construction and ontology learning.

In linguistics, is-a relations are called hyponymy. Words that describe categories are called hypernyms and words that are examples of categories are hyponyms. For example, dog is a hypernym and Fido is one of its hyponyms. A word can be both a hyponym and a hypernym. So, dog is a hyponym of mammal and also a hypernym of Fido.

Taxonomies are often represented as is-a hierarchies where each level is more specific than (in mathematical language "a subset of") the level above it. For example, a basic biology taxonomy would have concepts such as mammal, which is a subset of animal, and dogs and cats, which are subsets of mammal. This kind of taxonomy is called an is-a model because the specific objects are considered instances of a concept. For example, Fido is-a instance of the concept dog and Fluffy is-a cat.

== Applications ==
ATC can be used to build taxonomies for search engines, to improve search results.

ATC systems are a key component of ontology learning (also known as automatic ontology construction), and have been used to automatically generate large ontologies for domains such as insurance and finance. They have also been used to enhance existing large networks such as Wordnet to make them more complete and consistent.

== Other names ==
Other names for automatic taxonomy construction include:

- Automated outline building
- Automated outline construction
- Automated outline creation
- Automated outline extraction
- Automated outline generation
- Automated outline induction
- Automated outline learning
- Automated outlining
- Automated taxonomy building
- Automated taxonomy construction
- Automated taxonomy creation
- Automated taxonomy extraction
- Automated taxonomy generation
- Automated taxonomy induction
- Automated taxonomy learning
- Automatic outline building
- Automatic outline construction
- Automatic outline creation
- Automatic outline extraction
- Automatic outline generation
- Automatic outline induction
- Automatic outline learning
- Automatic taxonomy building
- Automatic taxonomy creation
- Automatic taxonomy extraction
- Automatic taxonomy generation
- Automatic taxonomy induction
- Automatic taxonomy learning
- Outline automation
- Outline building
- Outline construction
- Outline creation
- Outline extraction
- Outline generation
- Outline induction
- Outline learning
- Semantic taxonomy building
- Semantic taxonomy construction
- Semantic taxonomy creation
- Semantic taxonomy extraction
- Semantic taxonomy generation
- Semantic taxonomy induction
- Semantic taxonomy learning
- Taxonomy automation
- Taxonomy building
- Taxonomy construction
- Taxonomy creation
- Taxonomy extraction
- Taxonomy generation
- Taxonomy induction
- Taxonomy learning

== See also ==
- Document classification
- Information extraction
