= Jape =

Jape is a synonym for a practical joke.

Jape or JAPE may also refer to:

- Jape (band), an Irish electronic/rock band
- JAPE (linguistics), a transformation language widely used in natural language processing
- JAPE, an automated pun generator
- Jape (software), a Java-based proof assistant
- Java Annotations Pattern Engine – see General Architecture for Text Engineering

== See also ==
- Japes, a 2001 stage play by Simon Gray
