= Ralph Grishman =

Computer scientist

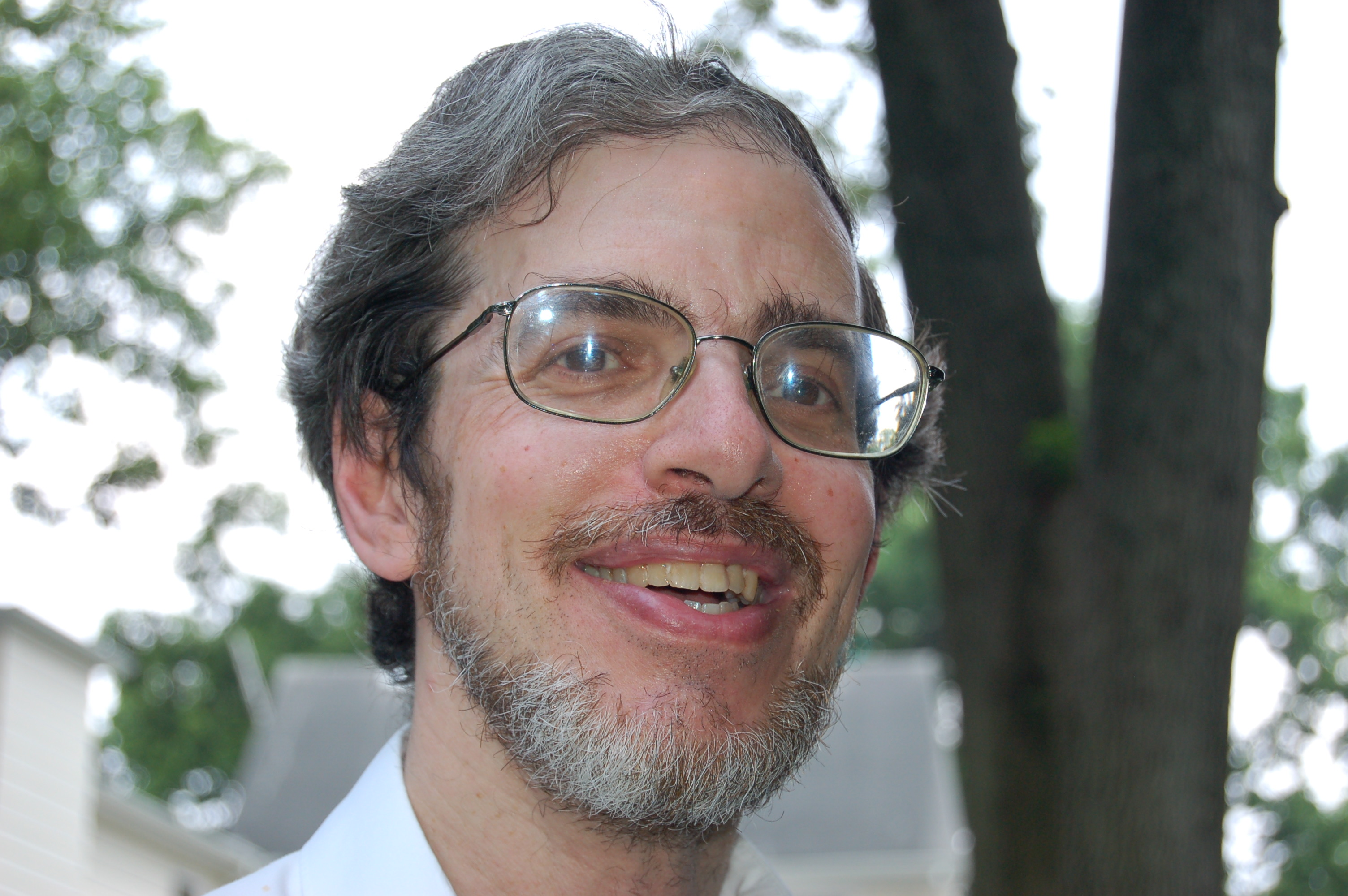
- Education: Columbia University (PhD in physics)
- Known for: Computational Linguistics, Natural Language Processing, Information Extraction
- Awards: Fellow of the Association of Computational Linguistics (2017), ACL Lifetime Achievement Award (2024)
- Scientific career
- Fields: computational linguistics, computer science
- Workplaces: New York University, Courant Institute of Mathematical Sciences
- Doctoral students: Carol Friedman, Heng Ji, Thien Huu Nguyen, Satoshi Sekine, Wei Xu, Roman Yangarber
- Website: Website @ New York University

Ralph Grishman is an American computer scientist and professor at New York University's Courant Institute. He is known for his work in computational linguistics, natural language processing (NLP), and for helping establish Information Extraction (IE) in NLP. Grishman's contributions were recognized by the Association for Computational Linguistics (ACL), the international body promoting research in computational linguistics, with its Lifetime Achievement Award in 2024.

== Career ==
Early in his career, Grishman worked with the Defense Advanced Research Projects Agency, where he served as a Member of the ARPA Speech & Natural Language Standing Committee (1992-1994) and as Chair of the DARPA TIPSTER Program Phase II Architecture Working Group from 1994 to 1998.

In 1990, Grishman served as Vice President of the international Association for Computational Linguistics (ACL), and was elected President of the ACL in 1991.

From 2010 to 2016, Grishman worked with the National Institute of Standards and Technology, and as the organizer of the Text Analysis Conference.

Grishman has acted as a program chair and a member of executive committees for numerous conferences of the ACL and its various chapters. In 2017, he was elected a Fellow of the Association for Computational Linguistics. In 2024, he was awarded the ACL Lifetime Achievement Award.

=== Research ===
Ralph Grishman's work covers a range of problems in the field of computational linguistics and natural language processing.

=== Information extraction ===
Grishman worked in Information Extraction, and was one of the original designers of and contributors to the MUC competitions (MUCs). His ‘‘Proteus’’ system achieved high performance among the more than 20 international participants — from academia and the industry — at the Sixth MUC (MUC-6), specifically, taking first place in the ‘‘Scenario Template’’ task, which was the most complex task evaluated at MUC-6.

=== Other areas of NLP ===
Grishman worked on the Linguistic String Project, led by Naomi Sager.

He has published in areas including information extraction, machine learning, machine translation, syntactic parsing, and syntactic treebanks for natural languages. His work appears in the proceedings of computer science conferences, including the meetings of the Association for Computational Linguistics and EMNLP.

His published monographs include a textbook on Computational Linguistics.
