= Heng Ji =

Computer scientist

- Born: China
- Education: New York University (PhD and MSc in Computer Science); Tsinghua University (M.A. and B.A. in Computational Linguistics)
- Known for: Information Extraction; Natural Language Processing
- Scientific career
- Fields: Computer Science
- Workplaces: University of Illinois at Urbana-Champaign; Amazon; Rensselaer Polytechnic Institute; City University of New York
- Thesis: Improving Information Extraction and Translation Using Component Interactions (2008)
- Doctoral advisor: Ralph Grishman
- Website: Personal website

Heng Ji is a computer scientist who works on information extraction and natural language processing. She is well known for her work on joined named entity recognition and relation extraction, as well as for her work on cross-document event extraction. She has been coordinating the popular NIST TAC Knowledge Base Population task since 2010. She has been recognised as one of AI's 10 to watch by IEEE Intelligent Systems in 2013, and has won multiple awards, including a NSF Career Award in 2009, Google Research awards in 2009 and 2014, and an IBM Watson Faculty Award in 2012.

== Education ==
Heng Ji obtained a Bachelor's and master's degree in Computational Linguistics from Tsinghua University. She subsequently obtained a MSc, then PhD in Computer Science from New York University in 2008 under the supervision of Ralph Grishman. Her PhD thesis was on the topic of information extraction, with a particular focus on joint training of multiple components in the information extraction pipeline, as well as cross-lingual learning.

== Career ==
Upon graduating with a PhD from New York University, Ji took up a position as assistant professor at Queens College, City University of New York, where she founded the BLENDER Lab, which focuses on research on cross-lingual, cross-documents, cross-media information extraction and fusion. In 2013, she joined Rensselaer Polytechnic Institute as an Edward P. Hamilton Development Chair and Tenured associate professor in Computer Science. Since 2019, she has been a full professor at the University of Illinois at Urbana–Champaign, as well as an Amazon Scholar.

== Research ==
Heng Ji works in the area of natural language processing, machine learning and information extraction. She has published over 300 peer-reviewed research papers. Her work is published in the proceedings of computer science conferences, including the Annual Meeting of the Association for Computational Linguistics, The Web Conference, and the ACM Conference on Knowledge Discovery and Data Mining (KDD). Ji is a leading researcher in information extraction, having coordinated the popular NIST TAC Knowledge Base Population shared task since 2010. She is most recognised for her work on modelling interactions between subtasks in information extraction, which was also the topic of her PhD thesis, and for her work on event detection using cross-document signals.

== Selected honors and distinctions ==
- 2009 NSF Career Award
- 2009 Google Research Award
- 2012 IBM Watson Faculty Award
- 2013 IEEE AI's 10 to Watch
- 2014 Google Research Award
- 2016 World Economic Forum, 'Young Scientist'
- 2017 World Economic Forum, 'Young Scientist'
- 2020 Annual Meeting of the Association for Computational Linguistics, best demonstration paper
