= Carol Friedman =

Biomedical informatician

- Education: New York University; City College of New York
- Known for: MedLEEMedical language processing GENIES Medical language processing
- Awards: AMIA Donald A. B. Lindberg Award for Innovation in Biomedical Informatics, 2010; Fellow of the New York Academy of Medicine, 2006; Fellow, ACMI; National Academy of Medicine (IOM 2016)
- Scientific career
- Fields: Medical language processing Biomedical Informatics; Pharmacovigilance; Electronic medical record EAV model in EMR
- Workplaces: Columbia University; Queens College, CUNY
- Academic advisors: Ralph Grishman
- Notable students: Yves A. Lussier; Eneida A. Mendonça; Chuang Jen-hsiang

Carol Friedman is a scientist and biomedical informatician. She is among the pioneers the use of expert systems in medical language processing and the explicit medical concept representation underpinning the use of entity–attribute–value modeling underpinning electronic medical records.

== Life ==
Before her doctoral degree, working under the direction of Naomi Sager at New York University, she also contributed to the development of second generation medical language processing systems. After her doctoral degree in computer science (natural language processing) under Ralph Grishman at the Courant Institute of Mathematics at New York University, she has developed annotative clinical information systems that have been integrated in the New York–Presbyterian Hospital, and the Columbia University Medical Center.

She is recognized for her development, translation to clinical practice and evaluation of the MedLEE medical language processing system. MedLEE is in daily use for clinical decision support at NewYork–Presbyterian Hospital. She adapted and evaluated the MedLEE system to build biomolecular and genotype-phenotype networks (GENIES and BioMedLEE respectively). MedLEE and GENIES exemplify the translation to practice of the sub-language theory proposed by Zellig Harris that Friedman pursued. In summary, she has been demonstrating the value of natural language processing for a broad range of clinical and biomedical applications that include decision support, automated encoding, vocabulary development, sub-language grammar applied to biomedicine, clinical research, outcomes analysis, error detection, and genomics research.

Friedman is a professor of biomedical informatics at Columbia University. Friedman was a member of the Board of Regents of the National Library of Medicine from 2007 to 2011, and has published over 150 articles.

== Publications ==
- Hsinchun Chen, ed. (21 June 2005). Medical Informatics: Knowledge Management and Data Mining in Biomedicine. Springer. ISBN 978-0-387-24381-8.
- Naomi Sager; Carol Friedman; Margaret S. Lyman (1987). Medical language processing: computer management of narrative data. Addison-Wesley Pub. Co. ISBN 978-0-201-16810-5.
- "Carol Friedman". PubMed. National Center for Biotechnology Information, U.S. National Library of Medicine.
