= Jev =

Jev or JEV can refer to:

== Science and technology ==
- Japanese encephalitis virus, infectious disease affecting the brain
- Jev (AI model), a discriminative model

== People ==
- FaZe Jev, content creator for the FaZe Clan from 2014 to 2025
- Jev Tothill (born 1928/9), Canadian politician
- Jean-Éric Vergne (born 1990), French racing driver also known by his initials "JEV"
- Jev. (born 2000), Congolese-Canadian rapper

== Other uses ==
- Évry Heliport (IATA: JEV), heliport in Évry-Courcouronnes, Essonne, France; see List of airports in France
- Jev, fictional character in the Star Trek: The Next Generation episode "Violations"
- Journal of Extracellular Vesicles, an academic journal
- Jupiter Entertainment Ventures, subsidiary of Asianet News
- Youth of European Nationalities, international organization for European minority languages

== See also ==
- Emmanuel Yisa Orker-Jev, Nigerian senator
- GreenWheel EV JEV, model of electric vehicle
