= Purkinje =

Purkinje is a name attributed to several biological features, so named for their discovery by Czech anatomist Jan Evangelista Purkyně:

- Purkinje cells, located in the cerebellum
- Purkinje fibers, located in the heart
- The visual Purkinje effect of how human beings do not see color in dim light
- Purkinje images, reflections of objects from the surface of the cornea, and from the anterior and posterior surfaces of the lens
- Purkinje Incorporated, a company that develops healthcare information technology software and services
