= Wikification =

Wikification may refer to:

- the application of wiki markup to text
- in computer science, entity linking with Wikipedia as the target knowledge base
