= James J. Cimino =

Physician-scientist and biomedical informatician

- Education: Brown University; New York Medical College; Massachusetts General Hospital
- Known for: Controlled Medical Vocabulary (Medical Entity Dictionary, Research Entity Dictionary, UMLS); Infobuttons
- Awards: Medal of Honor, NYMC; President’s Award, AMIA; NIH Clinical Center Director's Award for BTRIS
- Scientific career
- Fields: Medical concept representation Controlled vocabulary Biomedical Informatics; Medical decision making
- Workplaces: Columbia University; UAB School of Medicine
- Academic advisors: G. Octo Barnett
- Doctoral students: Eneida A. Mendonça
- Other notable students: Yves A. Lussier

James J. "Jim" Cimino is an American physician-scientist and biomedical informatician. He is Professor of Medicine and Director of the Informatics Institute at the University of Alabama at Birmingham School of Medicine and Adjunct Professor of Biomedical Informatics at Columbia University. He is an elected fellow of the American College of Medical Informatics and a member of the National Academy of Medicine.

== Education and training ==
Cimino received a Sc.B. in Biology from Brown University in 1977 and an M.D. from New York Medical College in 1981. He completed a residency in internal medicine at Saint Vincent’s Hospital and a fellowship in medical informatics at Massachusetts General Hospital.

== Career ==
Cimino pioneered the theory and formalisms of medical concept representation underpinning the use of controlled medical vocabularies in electronic medical records in support of clinical decision-making. Training under Octo Barnett at Harvard University, he also contributed to the initiation of the Unified Medical Language System. In addition, he actively practices medicine as an internist and has devoted many years to develop and innovate clinical information systems that have been integrated in the New York–Presbyterian Hospital, and the Columbia University Medical Center.

Cimino currently serves as Professor of Medicine, inaugural Director of the Informatics Institute, and Informatics Director for the Center for Clinical and Translational Science at the UAB School of Medicine. He was previously Chief of the Laboratory for Informatics Development at the NIH Clinical Center and Professor of Biomedical Informatics at Columbia University (2002-2007). At Columbia, he mentored Yves A. Lussier. He remains an adjunct professor of Biomedical Informatics at Columbia. He continues to teach at Columbia University as an Adjunct Professor of Biomedical Informatics.

Cimino has over 600 publications; as of June 2025, his h-index is 81.
