= Springer Nature =

Academic publisher

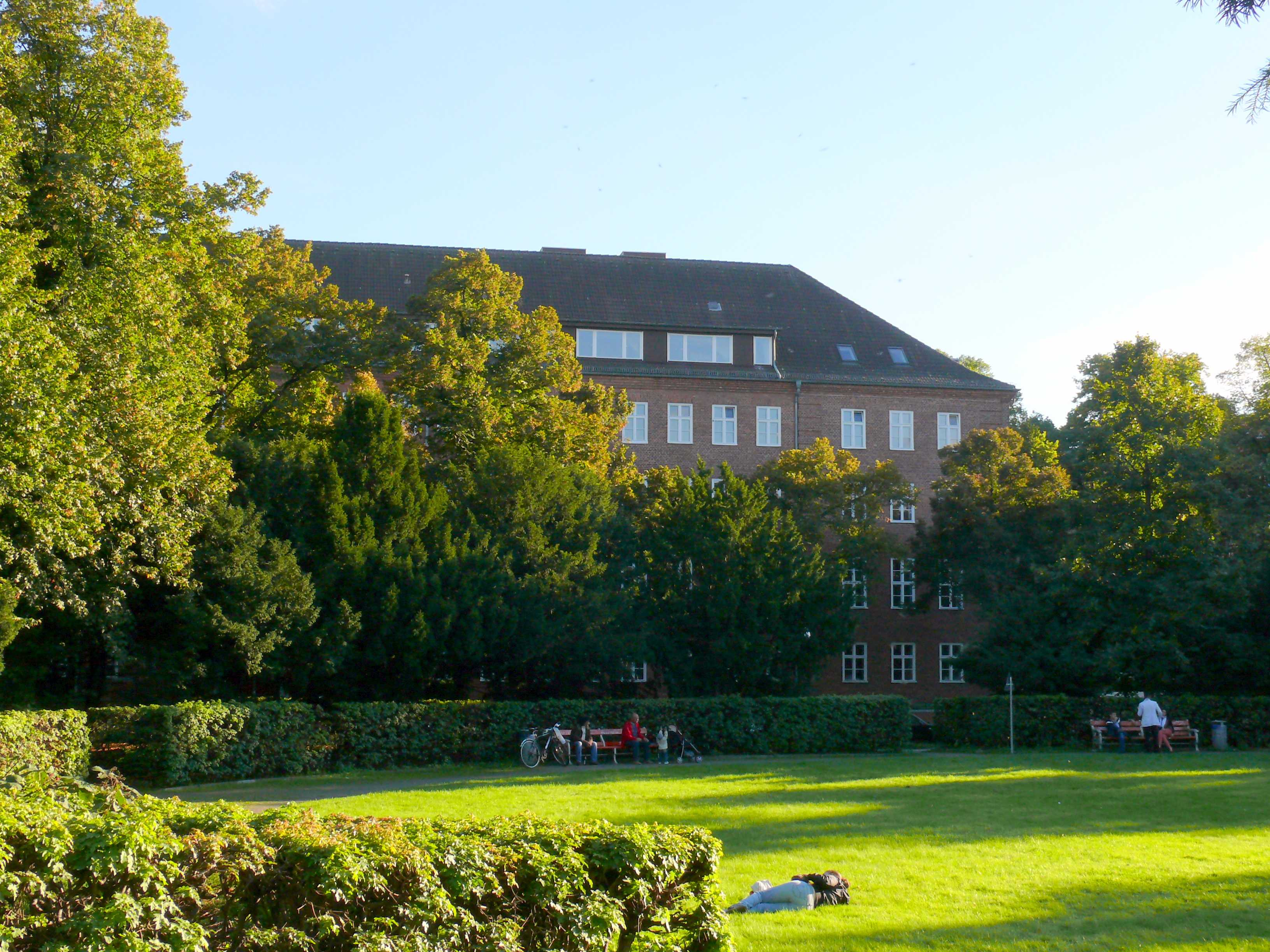
- Office at 3 Heidelberger Platz, Berlin
- Type: Public Kommanditgesellschaft auf Aktien with an Aktiengesellschaft as general partner
- Traded as: FWB: SPG; SDAX
- Industry: Publishing
- Founded: 2015; 11 years ago
- Headquarters: London (global); Berlin (corporate); New York City (sales)
- Area served: Worldwide
- Key people: Frank Vrancken Peeters (CEO)
- Revenue: US$ 2.15 billion (2025)
- Number of employees: 9500 (2025)
- Website: springernature.com

Springer Nature is a German-British academic publishing company created by the May 2015 merger of Springer Science+Business Media and Holtzbrinck Publishing Group's Nature Publishing Group, Palgrave Macmillan, and Macmillan Education.

== History ==
The company originates from several journals and publishing houses, notably Springer-Verlag, which was founded in 1842 by Julius Springer in Berlin (the grandfather of Bernhard Springer who founded Springer Publishing in 1950 in New York), Nature Publishing Group which has published Nature since 1869, and Macmillan Education, which goes back to Macmillan Publishers founded in 1843.

Springer Nature was formed in 2015 by the merger of Nature Publishing Group, Palgrave Macmillan, and Macmillan Education (held by Holtzbrinck Publishing Group) with Springer Science+Business Media (held by BC Partners). Plans for the merger were first announced on 15 January 2015. The transaction was concluded in May 2015 with Holtzbrinck having the majority 53% share.

IPO attempts in May 2018 and autumn 2020 failed due to unfavorable market conditions. The IPO succeeded in October 2024.

In 2021, Springer Nature acquired Atlantis Press, an open access publisher founded in Paris in 2006, focusing on scientific, technical, and medical (STM) content, and publication of conference proceedings.

== Current company ==
After the merger, former Springer Science+Business Media CEO Derk Haank became CEO of Springer Nature. When he retired by the end of 2017, he was succeeded by Daniel Ropers, the co-founder and long-time CEO of bol.com. In September 2019, Ropers was replaced by Frank Vrancken Peeters.

In 2019 and 2021, Springer Nature published several documents on its policies, including a Modern Slavery Act statement, a Tax strategy, and a gender pay gap report for Springer Nature's UK operations.

Springer Nature is a signatory of the SDG Publishers Compact, and stated that it was taking steps to support the achievement of the Sustainable Development Goals (SDGs) in the publishing industry. These include becoming carbon neutral as of 2020, organizing its publications into 17 SDG-related content hubs, and launching thematic journals such as Nature Climate Change, Nature Energy, Nature Sustainability, Nature Food, Nature Human Behaviour, Nature Water and Nature Cities (appearing 2024). In 2014, the Nature Portfolio series of themed online journals was launched.

Springer's journal Environment, Development, and Sustainability was one of six out of 100 journals to receive the highest possible "Five Wheel" impact rating from the SDG Impact Intensity™ journal rating system, based on an analysis of data from 2016–2020 that assessed relevance to the Sustainable Development Goals (SDGs).

=== Brands ===
The following major brands belong to the group (see also Subsidiaries):

- Nature
- Springer.com
- BioMed Central
- Heinrich Vogel Verlag
- SciGraph

Springer owned Scientific American until June 2026, when it was sold to LabX Media Group.

== Controversies ==
In 2017, Springer removed access to hundreds of articles for Chinese users, cutting off access to articles related to Tibet, Taiwan, and Chinese politics and human rights issues.

The company retracted a paper in 2019, in its journal BMC Emergency Medicine due to a dubious peer-review process (a herpetologist could have denied the publication of the paper).

In July 2020, Springer Nature retracted a paper in the journal Society due to a dubious review process and criticism regarding racism.

In August 2020, Springer Nature was reported to have rejected the publication of an article at the behest of its co-publisher, Wenzhou Medical University, from a Taiwanese doctor because the word "China" was not placed after "Taiwan".

In November 2021, Springer Nature retracted 44 nonsense papers from the Arabian Journal of Geosciences after a lapse in the peer review process.

In August 2023, after an investigation, Springer Nature retracted a paper that claimed there is no evidence of a global climate crisis. (Note: Before the paper was retracted, Sky News Australia – a news station priorly outed as a centre for climate change misinformation – published two segments on the paper, which were then subsequently viewed over half a million times on YouTube.)

In October 2025, Anna Krylov, a professor of chemistry at the University of Southern California, published an open letter calling for a boycott of Nature journals, accusing the publisher of abandoning its scientific mission in favor of a "social justice agenda". Krylov criticized Nature Reviews Psychology for encouraging "citation justice" practices aimed at promoting works by authors from favored identity groups, and Nature Human Behaviour for publishing editorial guidance stating an intent to consider potential social harm when evaluating research submissions. The letter received support from evolutionary biologist Richard Dawkins. A Springer Nature spokesperson responded that citation diversity statements are optional for authors and do not affect content evaluation.

In November 2025, a reviewer for Discover Artificial Intelligence stated that "GPT-5 does not exist," treated the paper's subject matter as fictional, and declared its methodology "impossible." The author appealed, raising the possibility of AI-generated peer review. The journal found no evidence of AI involvement, characterizing the GPT-5 error as "a very minor element" and concluding that the review reflected "careful reading and domain expertise." The journal stated that "any editor or reviewer with basic research training in this field would reasonably reach the same conclusion."

Springer Nature's peer review policy asks peer reviewers not to upload manuscripts into generative AI tools, citing concerns about sensitive information and the limitations of AI. In April 2026, in correspondence with the Committee on Publication Ethics (COPE), Springer Nature stated that AI use by peer reviewers for language editing purposes may be considered acceptable on a case-by-case basis.

In 2026, Springer Nature announced that it would begin issuing expressions of concern for books while investigations into potential integrity issues are ongoing. Springer Nature also stated that it was reviewing and strengthening its book peer-review and research-integrity processes, including additional safeguards and post-publication reviews.

On 23 June 2026, Springer Nature announced the sale of Scientific American to LabX Media Group, to "divest its consumer media businesses" and focus on its core academic publishing. The Writers Guild of America East unit at the publication criticized the sale, along with the attendant layoff of 15 staff members including the majority of the unit's organizers and salary reductions for other staff, as motivated by union-busting and censorship. The sale took place 3 days before the NLRB counted unionization votes, which were 31 to 1 in favor of the union. On 30 June 2026, Scientific American staff held a rally outside Springer Nature's Manhattan offices in protest.

== Lawsuits ==
In September 2024, Lucina Uddin, a neuroscience professor at UCLA, sued Springer Nature along with five other academic journal publishers in a proposed class-action lawsuit, alleging that the publishers violated antitrust law by agreeing not to compete against each other for manuscripts and by denying scholars payment for peer review services.

== Subsidiaries ==
- Adis International
- Apress
- Asser Press
- BioMed Central
- Bohn Stafleu van Loghum
- J. B. Metzler
- Macmillan Education
- Nature Research
- Palgrave Macmillan
- Springer Healthcare
- Springer VS
- Springer Verlag
- Springer Gabler
- Springer Vieweg Verlag
- Springer Medizin
- Springer Pflege
- Springer Nature Technology and Publishing Solutions
- SciGraph

== See also ==
- Publishing
- Scientific publication
