= Gensim =

Vector space modeling and topic modeling toolkit

- Original author: Radim Řehůřek
- Developer: Radim Řehůřek
- Release: 2009
- Stable release: 4.4.0 / 16 October 2025; 8 months ago
- Written in: Python
- Operating system: Linux, Windows, macOS
- Type: Information retrieval
- License: LGPL
- Website: radimrehurek.com/gensim/
- Repository: github.com/piskvorky/gensim

Gensim is an open-source library for unsupervised topic modeling, document indexing, retrieval by similarity, and other natural language processing functionalities, using modern statistical machine learning.

Gensim is implemented in Python and Cython for performance. Gensim is designed to handle large text collections using data streaming and incremental online algorithms, which differentiates it from most other machine learning software packages that target only in-memory processing.

== Main features ==
Gensim includes streamed parallelized implementations of fastText, word2vec and doc2vec algorithms, as well as latent semantic analysis (LSA, LSI, SVD), non-negative matrix factorization (NMF), latent Dirichlet allocation (LDA), tf-idf and random projections.

Some of the novel online algorithms in Gensim were also published in the 2011 PhD dissertation Scalability of Semantic Analysis in Natural Language Processing of Radim Řehůřek, the creator of Gensim.

== Uses of Gensim ==
Gensim library has been used and cited in over 1400 commercial and academic applications as of 2018, in a diverse array of disciplines from medicine to insurance claim analysis to patent search. The software has been covered in several new articles, podcasts and interviews.

== Free and commercial support ==
The open source code is developed and hosted on GitHub and a public support forum is maintained on Google Groups and Gitter.

== See also ==
- Comparison of machine learning software
- Natural Language Toolkit
- SpaCy
