= Yves A. Lussier =

Canadian physician and scientist

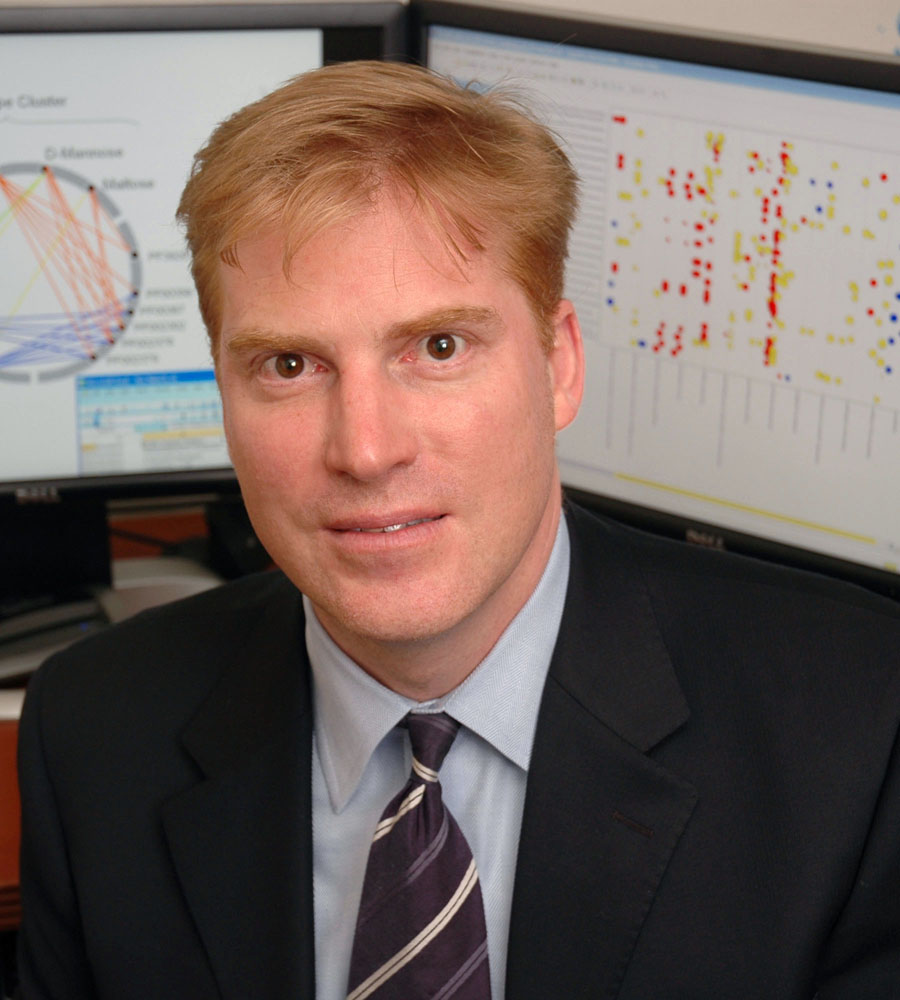
- Born: Montreal, Quebec, Canada
- Education: Columbia University; Université de Sherbrooke; Université Laval
- Known for: -co-founder of Development Purkinje (Purkinje Incorporated) -co-Founder and 2009 Chair; AMIA Summit on Translational Bioinformatics -VigiLens Health Monitor
- Scientific career
- Fields: Precision medicine, Translational bioinformatics, Personal Genomics, Personalized medicine, Cancer and Biomedical Informatics, Biomedical Ontologies, Medical Language Processing
- Workplaces: University of Utah; University of Arizona; University of Illinois Hospital & Health Sciences System; The University of Chicago; Columbia University; Centre Hospitalier de l'Université de Sherbrooke (CHUS)
- Academic advisors: James J. Cimino, Carol Friedman, Roger Côté

Notes
- websites University-of-Arizona, lussierlab.org

Yves A. Lussier is a physician and scientist conducting research in precision medicine, translational bioinformatics and personal genomics. As a co-founder of Purkinje, he pioneered the commercial use of controlled medical vocabulary organized as directed semantic networks in electronic medical records, as well as Pen computing for clinicians.

== Career ==
Lussier works in both clinical medicine and biomedical informatics. He is a Professor and Chair at the Department of Biomedical Informatics at the University of Utah.

Lussier served as Director of Technology transfer and Assist Prof. at Columbia University Depts. of Medicine and of Biomedical Informatics, Center for Computational Biology and Bioinformatics (C2B2) and Columbia Joint Center for Systems Biology from 2001-6. He was the Faculty Speaker at the PhD convocation of Columbia University in 2004. Lussier is a recipient of three IBM Faculty Awards. He was Associate Professor of Medicine at The University of Chicago, he directed of Center for Biomedical Informatics (CBI), was Associate Director for Informatics of the Cancer Center, and joint Director for Informatics of University of Chicago Cancer Center from 2006-2011. He was Professor of Medicine, Bioengineering and Pharmaceutical Sciences at The University of Illinois at Chicago, Assistant Vice President for Health Affairs at the University of Illinois Hospital and Health Science System, Associate Director for Informatics of the Illinois Cancer Center, and Faculty Director of the Center for Research Informatics (core facility) from 2011-13. He was also a Professor of Medicine at the University of Arizona, Associate Vice President (Chief knowledge officer) at the University of Arizona Health Sciences, Associate Director of BIO5, and Associate Director for Informatics and Precision medicine of the UA Cancer Center.

From 2006-2013, Lussier served as Fellow of the Institute for Genomics and Systems Biology and of the Computation Institute. He was appointed as the General Chair of the 2009 American Medical Informatics Association (AMIA) Summit on Translational Bioinformatics and has made a significant contribution to the emerging field of translational bioinformatics and personalized medicine. He serves on the editorial board of the Journal of Biomedical Informatics, Journal of the American Medical Informatics Association, and on the Journal of Personalized Medicine. He cumulated over 130 publications as well as multiple commencement, conference keynote lectureships and 300 abstract communications and invited lectures. Lussier is an elected Fellow of American College of Medical Informatics (ACMI) since 2005, and was awarded the title of Ambassador for Health Science of the University of Sherbrooke in 2017

== Awards and honours ==
- Inducted Fellow, American College of Medical Informatics (2005)
- IBM Faculty Awards 2003, 2004 1st recipient, Columbia University Faculty Mentoring Award
- Outstanding Paper Awards, 2008(2), 2009, 2010, 2011 Summit for Translational Bioinformatics AMIA
- Distinguished paper award 2011 AMIA
- Best papers awards, Translational Bioinformatics Conference 2012 and 2013
- Ambassador for Health Science of the University of Sherbrooke in 2017.

== Other sources ==
- Liu, Yang; Li, Jianrong; Sam, Lee; Goh, Chern-Sing; Gerstein, Mark; Lussier, Yves A. (2006). "An Integrative Genomic Approach to Uncover Molecular Mechanisms of Prokaryotic Traits". PLOS Computational Biology. 2 (11): e159. Bibcode:2006PLSCB...2..159L. doi:10.1371/journal.pcbi.0020159. PMC 1636675. PMID 17112314.
- Goh, Chern-Sing; Gianoulis, Tara A.; Liu, Yang; Li, Jianrong; Paccanaro, Alberto; Lussier, Yves A.; Gerstein, Mark (12 October 2006). "Integration of curated databases to identify genotype-phenotype associations". BMC Genomics. 7 257. doi:10.1186/1471-2164-7-257. PMC 1630430. PMID 17038185.
- Chen, James L.; Liu, Yang; Sam, Lee T.; Li, Jianrong; Lussier, Yves A. (9 May 2007). "Evaluation of high-throughput functional categorization of human disease genes". BMC Bioinformatics. 8 (3): S7. doi:10.1186/1471-2105-8-S3-S7. PMC 1892104. PMID 17493290.
- Masys, D. R. (2006). "American College of Medical Informatics Fellows and International Associates, 2005". Journal of the American Medical Informatics Association. 13 (3): 360–364. doi:10.1197/jamia.M2057. PMC 1513661.
