= Open information extraction =

Task in natural language processing

In natural language processing, open information extraction (OIE) is the task of generating a structured, machine-readable representation of the information in text, usually in the form of triples or n-ary propositions.

== Overview ==
A proposition can be understood as truth-bearer, a textual expression of a potential fact (e.g., "Dante wrote the Divine Comedy"), represented in an amenable structure for computers [e.g., ("Dante", "wrote", "Divine Comedy")]. An OIE extraction normally consists of a relation and a set of arguments. For instance, ("Dante", "passed away in" "Ravenna") is a proposition formed by the relation "passed away in" and the arguments "Dante" and "Ravenna". The first argument is usually referred as the subject while the second is considered to be the object.

The extraction is said to be a textual representation of a potential fact because its elements are not linked to a knowledge base. Furthermore, the factual nature of the proposition has not yet been established. In the above example, transforming the extraction into a full fledged fact would first require linking, if possible, the relation and the arguments to a knowledge base. Second, the truth of the extraction would need to be determined. In computer science transforming OIE extractions into ontological facts is known as relation extraction.

In fact, OIE can be seen as the first step to a wide range of deeper text understanding tasks such as relation extraction, knowledge-base construction, question answering, semantic role labeling. The extracted propositions can also be directly used for end-user applications such as structured search (e.g., retrieve all propositions with "Dante" as subject).

OIE was first introduced by TextRunner developed at the University of Washington Turing Center headed by Oren Etzioni. Other methods introduced later such as Reverb, OLLIE, ClausIE or CSD helped to shape the OIE task by characterizing some of its aspects. At a high level, all of these approaches make use of a set of patterns to generate the extractions. Depending on the particular approach, these patterns are either hand-crafted or learned.

== OIE systems and contributions ==
Reverb suggested the necessity to produce meaningful relations to more accurately capture the information in the input text. For instance, given the sentence "Faust made a pact with the devil", it would be erroneous to just produce the extraction ("Faust", "made", "a pact") since it would not be adequately informative. A more precise extraction would be ("Faust", "made a pact with", "the devil"). Reverb also argued against the generation of overspecific relations.

OLLIE stressed two important aspects for OIE. First, it pointed to the lack of factuality of the propositions. For instance, in a sentence like "If John studies hard, he will pass the exam", it would be inaccurate to consider ("John", "will pass", "the exam") as a fact. Additionally, the authors indicated that an OIE system should be able to extract non-verb mediated relations, which account for significant portion of the information expressed in natural language text. For instance, in the sentence "Obama, the former US president, was born in Hawaii", an OIE system should be able to recognize a proposition ("Obama", "is", "former US president").

ClausIE introduced the connection between grammatical clauses, propositions, and OIE extractions. The authors stated that as each grammatical clause expresses a proposition, each verb mediated proposition can be identified by solely recognizing the set of clauses expressed in each sentence. This implies that to correctly recognize the set of propositions in an input sentence, it is necessary to understand its grammatical structure. The authors studied the case in the English language that only admits seven clause types, meaning that the identification of each proposition only requires defining seven grammatical patterns.

The finding also established a separation between the recognition of the propositions and its materialization. In a first step, the proposition can be identified without any consideration of its final form, in a domain-independent and unsupervised way, mostly based on linguistic principles. In a second step, the information can be represented according to the requirements of the underlying application, without conditioning the identification phase.

Consider the sentence "Albert Einstein was born in Ulm and died in Princeton". The first step will recognize the two propositions ("Albert Einstein", "was born", "in Ulm") and ("Albert Einstein", "died", "in Princeton"). Once the information has been correctly identified, the propositions can take the particular form required by the underlying application [e.g., ("Albert Einstein", "was born in", "Ulm") and ("Albert Einstein", "died in", "Princeton")].

CSD introduced the idea of minimality in OIE. It considers that computers can make better use of the extractions if they are expressed in a compact way. This is especially important in sentences with subordinate clauses. In these cases, CSD suggests the generation of nested extractions. For example, consider the sentence "The Embassy said that 6,700 Americans were in Pakistan". CSD generates two extractions [i] ("6,700 Americans", "were", "in Pakistan") and [ii] ("The Embassy", "said", "that [i]"). This is usually known as reification.
