= Taxonomy for search engines =

Taxonomy for search engines refers to classification methods that improve relevance in vertical search. Taxonomies of entities are tree structures whose nodes are labelled with entities likely to occur in a web search query. Searches use these trees to match keywords from a search query to keywords from answers (or snippets).

Taxonomies, thesauri and concept hierarchies are crucial components for many applications of information retrieval, natural language processing and knowledge management. Building, tuning and managing taxonomies and ontologies are costly since a lot of manual operations are required. A number of studies proposed the automated building of taxonomies based on linguistic resources and/or statistical machine learning. A number of tools using SKOS standard (including Unilexicon, PoolParty and Lexaurus editor to name a few) are also available to streamline work with taxonomies.

== See also ==
- Feature extraction
