= Document AI =

Field of technology that employs machine learning techniques

Document AI, also known as Document Intelligence, refers to a field of technology that employs machine learning (ML) techniques, such as natural language processing (NLP). These techniques are used to develop computer models capable of analyzing documents in a manner akin to human review.

Through NLP, computer systems are able to understand relationships and contextual nuances in document contents, which facilitates the extraction of information and insights. Additionally, this technology enables the categorization and organization of the documents themselves.

The applications of Document AI extend to processing and parsing a variety of semi-structured documents, such as forms, tables, receipts, invoices, tax forms, contracts, loan agreements, and financial reports.

== Key Features ==
Machine learning is utilized in Document AI to extract information from both digital and printed documents. This technology recognizes images, text, characters, and images in various languages, aiding in the extraction of insights from unstructured documents. The use of this technology can improve the speed and quality of decision-making in document analysis. Additionally, the automation of data extraction and validation can contribute to increased efficiency in document analysis processes.

== Example ==
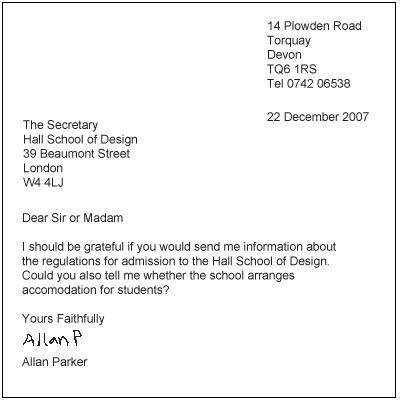
Formal-letter

A business letter contains information in for the form of text, as well as other types of information, such as the position of the text. For instance, a typical letter contains two addresses before the body of the text. The address at the very top (sometimes aligned to the right) is the sender address. This is normally followed by the date of the letter, with the place of writing. After this, the receiver address is listed.

The distinction between the sender address and the receiver address is conveyed solely by the position of the address on the page, i.e. there is no textual indication like Sender: in front of the addresses.

== Data dimensions & ML architecture ==
Data is typically distinguished in spatial data and time-series data, the former can be things like images, maps, graphs, etc. the latter can be e.g. stock-price or a voice recording. Document AI combines text data, which has a time dimension, with other types of data, such as the position of an address in a business letter, which is spatial.

Historically in machine learning spatial data was analyzed using a convolutional neural network, and temporal data using a recurrent neural network. With the advent of dimension-type agnostic transformer architecture, these two different types of dimension can be more easily combined, Document AI is an example of this.

== Common Uses ==
- Enhancing the reliability of business information by reducing manual data entry errors
- Utilizing AI to identify anomalies in new invoices from established customers
- Accelerating the mortgage workflow process
- Automating the monitoring of loan portfolios for credit risk management
- Enabling employee focus on higher-value tasks
- Detecting counterfeit currency and fraudulent checks
- Extracting and analyzing data previously inaccessible in document silos for informed business decisions
- Streamlining the processing of receipts on a global scale
- Assisting firms in automating the assessment of regulatory change impacts on contracts
- In the real estate sector, aiding in developing standardized document classification and automated information extraction
