= Ontology learning =

Automatic creation of ontologies

Ontology learning (ontology extraction, ontology augmentation generation, ontology generation, or ontology acquisition) is the automatic or semi-automatic creation of ontologies, including extracting the corresponding domain's terms and the relationships between the concepts that these terms represent from a corpus of natural language text, and encoding them with an ontology language for easy retrieval. As building ontologies manually is extremely labor-intensive and time-consuming, there is great motivation to automate the process.

Typically, the process starts by extracting terms and concepts or noun phrases from plain text using linguistic processors such as part-of-speech tagging and phrase chunking. Then statistical or symbolic techniques are used to extract relation signatures, often based on pattern-based or definition-based hypernym extraction techniques.

== Procedure ==
Ontology learning (OL) is used to (semi-)automatically extract whole ontologies from natural language text. The process is usually split into the following eight tasks, which are not all necessarily applied in every ontology learning system.

=== Domain terminology extraction ===
During the domain terminology extraction step, domain-specific terms are extracted, which are used in the following step (concept discovery) to derive concepts. Relevant terms can be determined, e.g., by calculation of the TF/IDF values or by application of the C-value / NC-value method. The resulting list of terms has to be filtered by a domain expert. In the subsequent step, similarly to coreference resolution in information extraction, the OL system determines synonyms, because they share the same meaning and therefore correspond to the same concept. The most common methods therefore are clustering and the application of statistical similarity measures.

=== Concept discovery ===
In the concept discovery step, terms are grouped to meaning bearing units, which correspond to an abstraction of the world and therefore to concepts. The grouped terms are these domain-specific terms and their synonyms, which were identified in the domain terminology extraction step.

=== Concept hierarchy derivation ===
In the concept hierarchy derivation step, the OL system tries to arrange the extracted concepts in a taxonomic structure. This is mostly achieved with unsupervised hierarchical clustering methods. Because the result of such methods is often noisy, a supervision step, e.g., user evaluation, is added. A further method for the derivation of a concept hierarchy exists in the usage of several patterns that should indicate a sub- or supersumption relationship. Patterns like “X, that is a Y” or “X is a Y” indicate that X is a subclass of Y. Such pattern can be analyzed efficiently, but they often occur too infrequently to extract enough sub- or supersumption relationships. Instead, bootstrapping methods are developed, which learn these patterns automatically and therefore ensure broader coverage.

=== Learning of non-taxonomic relations ===
In the learning of non-taxonomic relations step, relationships are extracted that do not express any sub- or supersumption. Such relationships are, e.g., works-for or located-in. There are two common approaches to solve this subtask. The first is based upon the extraction of anonymous associations, which are named appropriately in a second step. The second approach extracts verbs, which indicate a relationship between entities, represented by the surrounding words. The result of both approaches need to be evaluated by an ontologist to ensure accuracy.

=== Rule discovery ===
During rule discovery, axioms (formal description of concepts) are generated for the extracted concepts. This can be achieved, e.g., by analyzing the syntactic structure of a natural language definition and the application of transformation rules on the resulting dependency tree. The result of this process is a list of axioms, which, afterwards, is comprehended to a concept description. This output is then evaluated by an ontologist.

=== Ontology population ===
At this step, the ontology is augmented with instances of concepts and properties. For the augmentation with instances of concepts, methods based on the matching of lexico-syntactic patterns are used. Instances of properties are added through the application of bootstrapping methods, which collect relation tuples.

=== Concept hierarchy extension ===
In this step, the OL system tries to extend the taxonomic structure of an existing ontology with further concepts. This can be performed in a supervised manner with a trained classifier or in an unsupervised manner via the application of similarity measures.

=== Frame and Event detection ===
During frame/event detection, the OL system tries to extract complex relationships from text, e.g., who departed from where to what place and when. Approaches range from applying SVM with kernel methods to semantic role labeling (SRL) to deep semantic parsing techniques.

== Tools ==
Dog4Dag (Dresden Ontology Generator for Directed Acyclic Graphs) is an ontology generation plugin for Protégé 4.1 and OBOEdit 2.1. It allows for term generation, sibling generation, definition generation, and relationship induction. Integrated into Protégé 4.1 and OBO-Edit 2.1, DOG4DAG allows ontology extension for all common ontology formats (e.g., OWL and OBO). Limited largely to EBI and Bio Portal lookup service extensions.

== See also ==
- Automatic taxonomy construction
- Computational linguistics
- Domain ontology
- Information extraction
- Natural language understanding
- Semantic Web
- Text mining

== Bibliography ==
- P. Buitelaar, P. Cimiano (Eds.). Ontology Learning and Population: Bridging the Gap between Text and Knowledge, Series information for Frontiers in Artificial Intelligence and Applications, IOS Press, 2008.
- P. Buitelaar, P. Cimiano, and B. Magnini (Eds.). Ontology Learning from Text: Methods, Evaluation and Applications, Series information for Frontiers in Artificial Intelligence and Applications, IOS Press, 2005.
- Wong, W. (2009), "Learning Lightweight Ontologies from Text across Different Domains using the Web as Background Knowledge". Doctor of Philosophy thesis, University of Western Australia.
- Wong, W., Liu, W. & Bennamoun, M. (2012), "Ontology Learning from Text: A Look back and into the Future". ACM Computing Surveys, Volume 44, Issue 4, Pages 20:1-20:36.
- Thomas Wächter, Götz Fabian, Michael Schroeder: DOG4DAG: semi-automated ontology generation in OBO-Edit and Protégé. SWAT4LS London, 2011. doi:10.1145/2166896.2166926
