= Semantic Scholar =

Search service for journal articles

- Website type: Search engine
- Creator: Allen Institute for Artificial Intelligence
- Website: semanticscholar.org
- Launched: November 2, 2015; 11 years ago

Semantic Scholar is a research tool for scientific literature. It is developed at the Allen Institute for AI and was publicly released in November 2015. Semantic Scholar uses modern techniques in natural language processing to support the research process, for example by providing automatically generated summaries of scholarly papers. The Semantic Scholar team is actively researching the use of artificial intelligence in natural language processing, machine learning, human–computer interaction, and information retrieval.

Semantic Scholar began as a database for the topics of computer science, geoscience, and neuroscience. In 2017, the system began including biomedical literature in its corpus. As of September 2022, it includes over 200 million publications from all fields of science.

== Technology ==
Semantic Scholar provides a one-sentence summary of scientific literature. One of its aims was to address the challenge of reading numerous titles and lengthy abstracts on mobile devices. It also seeks to ensure that the three million scientific papers published yearly reach readers, since it is estimated that only half of this literature is ever read.

Artificial intelligence is used to capture the essence of a paper, generating it through an "abstractive" technique. The project uses a combination of machine learning, natural language processing, and machine vision to add a layer of semantic analysis to the traditional methods of citation analysis, and to extract relevant figures, tables, entities, and venues from papers.

Another key AI-powered feature is Research Feeds, an adaptive research recommender that uses AI to quickly learn what papers users care about reading and recommends the latest research to help scholars stay up to date. It uses a paper embedding model trained using contrastive learning to find papers similar to those in each Library folder.

Semantic Scholar also offers Semantic Reader, an augmented reader with the potential to revolutionize scientific reading by making it more accessible and richly contextual. Semantic Reader provides in-line citation cards that allow users to see citations with TLDR (short for Too Long, Didn't Read) automatically generated short summaries as they read and skimming highlights that capture key points of a paper so users can digest faster.

In contrast with Google Scholar and PubMed, Semantic Scholar is designed to highlight the most important and influential elements of a paper. The AI technology is designed to identify hidden connections and links between research topics. Like the previously cited search engines, Semantic Scholar also exploits graph structures, which include the Microsoft Academic Knowledge Graph, Springer Nature's SciGraph, and the Semantic Scholar Corpus (originally a 45 million papers corpus in computer science, neuroscience and biomedicine).

== Article identifier ==
Each paper hosted by Semantic Scholar is assigned a unique identifier called the Semantic Scholar Corpus ID (abbreviated S2CID). The following entry is an example:Liu, Ying; Gayle, Albert A; Wilder-Smith, Annelies; Rocklöv, Joacim (March 2020). "The reproductive number of COVID-19 is higher compared to SARS coronavirus". Journal of Travel Medicine. 27 (2). doi:10.1093/jtm/taaa021. PMID 32052846. S2CID 211099356.

Semantic Scholar Corpus IDs provide information to become a valuable source of metadata of published papers from all fields in a JSON format. Semantic Scholar provides two unique identifiers for the paper itself and the author of the paper has a unique identifier as well. The S2CID helps with precise searching such as the sue of advanced filters and implementation of automatic snowballing over a set of pilot papers.

The unique article identifier Semantic Scholar utilizes a web crawler approach combing the web for citations and providing key details that represent the important elements of a paper (key people, data analysis, and graphical representation of citations) without requiring a great deal of reading. The unique identifier S2CID assigned to every paper hosted by Semantic Scholar assists with ranked citations and also provides help with a deep semantic analytic engine underlines all SS indexed publications, and this helps to understand the meaning of a paper. Semantic scholar's article identifiers serve as a metadata index that helps researchers find sources to aid in their research.

== Indexing ==
Semantic Scholar is free to use and unlike similar search engines (e.g., Google Scholar) does not search for material that is behind a paywall.

One study compared the index scope of Semantic Scholar to Google Scholar, and found that for the papers cited by secondary studies in computer science, the two indices had comparable coverage, each only missing a handful of the papers.

In 2026, Semantic Scholar listed these 35 publishers as source of scholarly metadata: Association for the Computational Linguistics, ACM, ArXiv.org, BioOne, bioRXiv, BMJ Journals, Cambridge University Press, CiteSeerX, CTTI Clinical Trials, DBLP, De Gruyter, Frontiers, HAL, HighWire, IEEE, IOP Publishing, Karger, medRXiv, Microsoft Academic Graph, Papers with Code, Project Muse, PubMed, SAGE Publishing, Science, Scientific.Net, ScitePress, Springer Nature, SPIE, SSRN, Taylor & Francis Group, The MIT Press, The Royal Society Publishing, The University of Chicago Press, Wiley, Wolters Kluwer.

== Number of users and publications ==
As of January 2018, following a 2017 project that added biomedical papers and topic summaries, the Semantic Scholar corpus included more than 40 million papers from computer science and biomedicine. In March 2018, Doug Raymond, who developed machine learning initiatives for the Amazon Alexa platform, was hired to lead the Semantic Scholar project. As of August 2019, the number of included papers metadata (not the actual PDFs) had grown to more than 173 million after the addition of the Microsoft Academic Graph records. In 2020, a partnership between Semantic Scholar and the University of Chicago Press Journals made all articles published under the University of Chicago Press available in the Semantic Scholar corpus. At the end of 2020, Semantic Scholar had indexed 190 million papers and reached seven million users per month. In 2026, it claims indexing 214 millions papers.

== Basic corpus for AI discovery tools ==
Semantic Scholar corpus is used by most of the AI discovery tools that start to emerge since 2020 : Elicit, SciSpace, Consensus.app, Undermind.ai, Asta of Ai2, etc. Alongside other freely open scholarly metadata infrastructures like OpenAlex or the permanent identifiers repositories (CrossRef for DOI, ORCID, etc.) helped the development of these tools.

== See also ==
- Citation analysis – Examination of the frequency, patterns, and graphs of citations in documents
- Citation index – Index of citations between publications
- Knowledge extraction – Creation of knowledge from structured and unstructured sources
- List of academic databases and search engines
- Scientometrics – Quantitative study of science
