= Eneida A. Mendonça =

Brazilian scientist

- Born: Brazil
- Education: Federal University of Pelotas; Heart Institute of Rio Grande do Sul
- Awards: Inducted Fellow, American College of Medical Informatics; 2001-HIMSS RP Covert Award; 21st Century Achievement Award for Education & Academia 2006 Computerworld Honors Program
- Scientific career
- Fields: Pediatrics; Biomedical Informatics; Translational bioinformatics
- Workplaces: Indiana University School of Medicine(2019-present); University of Wisconsin-Madison (2011–2019); University of Chicago (2008–2011); Columbia University(2002–2007); Catholic University of Rio Grande do Sul do Rio Grande do Sul (1991–1996)
- Academic advisors: James J. Cimino

Eneida A. Mendonça, is a Brazilian-born physician-scientist and biomedical informatician. She pioneered the use of natural language processing in both the biomedical literature and in electronic medical record narratives in order to identify knowledge relevant to medical decision making in the context of the patient care. In addition, she has devoted many years to develop innovative clinical information systems that have been integrated in the NewYork–Presbyterian Hospital, the Columbia University Medical Center, and the Cornell Medical Center. She was a member of the faculty at the University of Chicago. She holds a medical degree from the Federal University of Pelotas, Brazil and a Ph.D. in biomedical informatics from Columbia University, New York.

Currently, Mendonça is the Inaugural VP for Research Development of the Regenstrief Institute at the Indiana University School of Medicine. Mendonça has contributed over 100 publications to the fields of biomedical informatics and medicine.

== Publications ==
- Medline Publications
- Google Scholar Citations
