= SciGraph =

Search service for journal articles

- Website type: Search engine
- Creator: Springer Nature
- Launched: March 2017

SciGraph was a search engine tool developed by Springer Nature, the former URL was https://scigraph.springernature.com/explorer. The technology, which was considered a Linked Open Data (LOD) platform, collects information that covers the research landscape, which includes research projects, publications, conferences, funding agencies, and others. Key features of the platform include the detailed semantic description of the relationship of information and the visualization of the scholarly domain. It was launched in 2017 and retired in 2023.

== Development ==
The development of SciGraph began with an initiative to create a platform that will host Springer Nature's entire publication archive, which cover texts published as early as 1815. The number of these resources is reported to be about 13 million. The technology behind the platform was built on earlier Springer Nature projects developed for the purpose of collecting information on the research landscape. The first SciGraph data set was published in February 2017. The platform was launched in March 2017 and significantly expanded with the addition of publications of key partners. The datasets span a broad range of topics, which include computer science, medicine, life sciences, chemistry, engineering, and astronomy, among others. The developers also plan to include citations, patents, and clinical trials in the future.

== Technology ==
SciGraph constitutes 1.5 to 2 billion triples where a triple is formatted as "subject-predicate-object" and could link any subject or concept through a predicate (verb) to another object, demonstrating the type of relationship that exists between them. Its graph structure is used by other academic search engines such as Semantic Scholar.

SciGraph collects data from Springer Nature and its partners from the scholarly domain as well as funders, research projects, conferences, affiliations, and publications. The collected information serves as rich semantic description of how information is related and it also provides a visualization of the scholarly domain. The platform has been considered the only large-scale dataset that reconciles authors' affiliations through the disambiguation and linking with external authoritative datasets according to institutions.
