= JAPE (linguistics) =

In computational linguistics, JAPE is the Java Annotation Patterns Engine, a component of the open-source General Architecture for Text Engineering (GATE) platform. JAPE is a finite state transducer that operates over annotations based on regular expressions. Thus, it is useful for pattern-matching, semantic extraction, and many other operations over syntactic trees such as those produced by natural language parsers.

JAPE is a version of CPSL – Common Pattern Specification Language.

A JAPE grammar consists of a set of phases, each of which consists of a set of pattern/action rules. The phases run sequentially and constitute a cascade of finite state transducers over annotations. The left-hand-side (LHS) of the rules consist of an annotation pattern description. The right-hand-side (RHS) consists of annotation manipulation statements. Annotations matched on the LHS of a rule may be referred to on the RHS by means of labels that are attached to pattern elements.
