= DARPA TIPSTER Program =

US defense information retrieval program

The DARPA TIPSTER Text program was started in 1991 by the Defense Advanced Research Projects Agency (DARPA). It is a 9-year multi-million dollar initiative, which sought to improve Human Language Technology (HLT) for the handling of multilingual corpora that are utilized within the intelligence process. It involved a cluster of joint projects by the government, academia, and private sector.

The program supported research to improve informational retrieval and extraction software and worked to deploy these improved technologies to government users. This technology, which was of particular interest to defense and intelligence analysts who must review increasingly large amounts of text. The program had several phases. The first entailed the development of algorithms for information retrieval and extraction while the second phase developed an architecture.

The program was considered successful so that it was commercialized under the National Institute of Standards and Technology. An evaluation noted that the third phase of the TIPSTER program, which involved the development of the architecture called GATE (General Architecture for Text Engineering) did not achieve its intended goals due to its short life span as well as the inability of the government to enforce standards imposed by the TIPSTER software architecture.

== See also ==
- Message Understanding Conference
- Text Retrieval Conference
