= Natural Language Toolkit =

Software suite for natural language processing

- Original authors: Steven Bird, Edward Loper, Ewan Klein
- Developer: Team NLTK
- Release: 2001; 25 years ago
- Stable release: 3.9.1 / 19 August 2024; 22 months ago
- Written in: Python
- Type: Natural language processing
- License: Apache 2.0
- Website: www.nltk.org
- Repository: github.com/nltk/nltk

Parse tree generated with NLTK

The Natural Language Toolkit, or more commonly NLTK, is a suite of libraries and programs for symbolic and statistical natural language processing (NLP) for English written in the Python programming language. It supports classification, tokenization, stemming, tagging, parsing, and semantic reasoning functionalities. It was developed by Steven Bird and Edward Loper in the Department of Computer and Information Science at the University of Pennsylvania. NLTK includes graphical demonstrations and sample data. It is accompanied by a book that explains the underlying concepts behind the language processing tasks supported by the toolkit, plus a cookbook.

NLTK is intended to support research and teaching in NLP or closely related areas, including empirical linguistics, cognitive science, artificial intelligence, information retrieval, and machine learning. NLTK has been used successfully as a teaching tool, as an individual study tool, and as a platform for prototyping and building research systems.

== Library highlights ==
- Discourse representation
- Lexical analysis: Word and text tokenizer
- n-gram and collocations
- Part-of-speech tagger
- Tree model and Text chunker for capturing
- Named-entity recognition

== See also ==
- Gensim
- SpaCy
