= Purkinje Incorporated =

Canadian medical software company

- Type: Private
- Industry: Medical software
- Founded: Purkinje 1985, merged with Développement Purkinje in 1991
- Founder: Rénald St-Arnault (Purkinje, Dév. Purk.); Pierre-Paul Yale (Dév. Purk.); Michel Maksud (Purkinje, Dév. Purk.); Yves Lévesque (Dév. Purk.); Yves A. Lussier (Dév. Purk.)
- Headquarters: Montreal, Canada
- Area served: North America
- Products: Electronic Medical Record, Practice management software
- Owner: John Doerr and others
- Number of employees: 100
- Website: Purkinje.com

Purkinje Incorporated pioneered pen computing for comprehensive clinical management of patients by physicians in 1991 with the "PureMD" ontology-anchored medical record was later rename Dossier that allowed physician order entry, knowledge-based clinical decision support, and billing from clinical note-taking (e.g. medical history) recorded on a tablet computer. In 1994 and 2007, "Dossier" was respectively awarded the "OCTAS of excellence" and the "TEPR award for standalone eprescribing systems". Dossier's impact of on clinical redaction was evaluated in two peer-reviewed studies. "Purkinje software and services" currently serve over 13,000 physicians in clinics, community health centers, and hospitals throughout North America. The company provides health software and related services in the areas of practice management, electronic health records, personal health records, and electronic prescribing. In addition, Purkinje provides a series of professional services to physician practices including billing services, transcription, and medication dispensing.
