= General Architecture for Text Engineering =

GATE
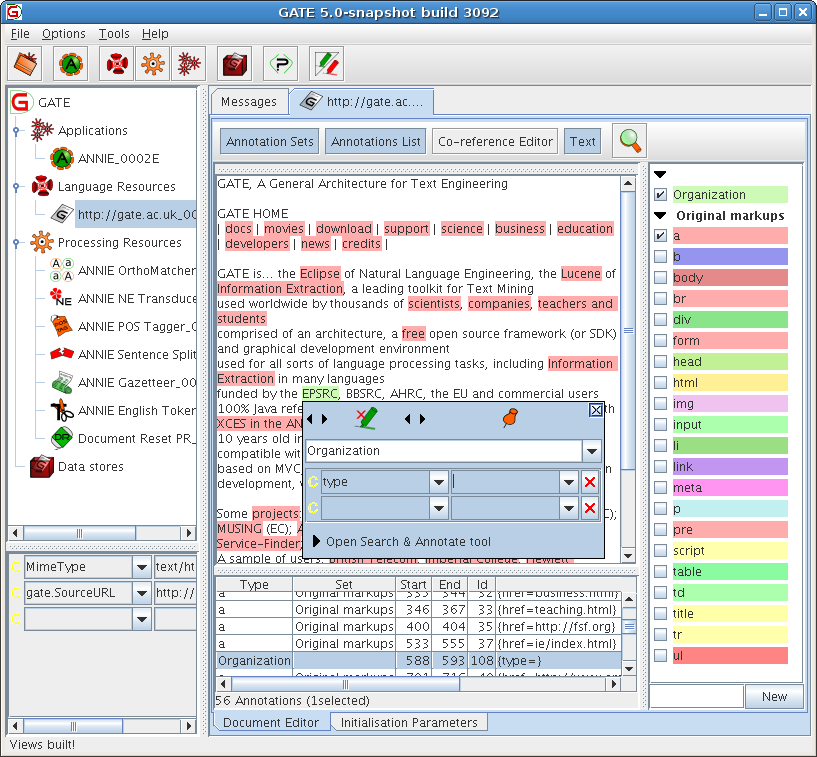
- GATE Developer v5 main window
- Developers: GATE research team, Dept. Computer Science, University of Sheffield
- Initial release: 1995; 31 years ago
- Stable release: 8.6.1 (January 17, 2020; 5 years ago) [±]
- Preview release: 9.0-SNAPSHOT (January 6, 2026 (Nightly builds released every day)) [±]
- Repository: github.com/GateNLP
- Written in: Java
- Operating system: Cross-platform
- Available in: English
- Type: Text mining Information extraction
- License: LGPL
- Website: gate.ac.uk

General Architecture for Text Engineering (GATE) is a Java suite of natural language processing (NLP) tools for man tasks, including information extraction in many languages. It is now used worldwide by a wide community of scientists, companies, teachers and students. It was originally developed at the University of Sheffield beginning in 1995.

As of May 28, 2011, 881 people are on the gate-users mailing list at SourceForge.net, and 111,932 downloads from SourceForge are recorded since the project moved to SourceForge in 2005. The paper "GATE: A framework and graphical development environment for robust NLP tools and applications" has received over 2000 citations since publication (according to Google Scholar). Books covering the use of GATE, in addition to the GATE User Guide, include "Building Search Applications: Lucene, LingPipe, and Gate", by Manu Konchady, and "Introduction to Linguistic Annotation and Text Analytics", by Graham Wilcock.

GATE community and research has been involved in several European research projects including: Transitioning Applications to Ontologies, SEKT, NeOn, Media-Campaign, Musing, Service-Finder, LIRICS and KnowledgeWeb.

== Features ==
GATE includes an information extraction system called ANNIE (A Nearly-New Information Extraction System) which is a set of modules comprising a tokenizer, a gazetteer, a sentence splitter, a part of speech tagger, a named entities transducer and a coreference tagger. ANNIE can be used as-is to provide basic information extraction functionality, or provide a starting point for more specific tasks.

Languages currently handled in GATE include English, Chinese, Arabic, Bulgarian, French, German, Hindi, Italian, Cebuano, Romanian, Russian, Danish.

Plugins are included for machine learning with Weka, RASP, MAXENT, SVM Light, as well as a LIBSVM integration and an in-house perceptron implementation, for managing ontologies like WordNet, for querying search engines like Google or Yahoo, for part of speech tagging with Brill or TreeTagger, and many more. Many external plugins are also available, for handling e.g. tweets.

GATE accepts input in various formats, such as TXT, HTML, XML, Doc, PDF documents, and Java Serial, PostgreSQL, Lucene, Oracle Databases with help of RDBMS storage over JDBC.

JAPE transducers are used within GATE to manipulate annotations on text. Documentation is provided in the GATE User Guide. A tutorial has also been written by Press Association Images.

== GATE Developer ==
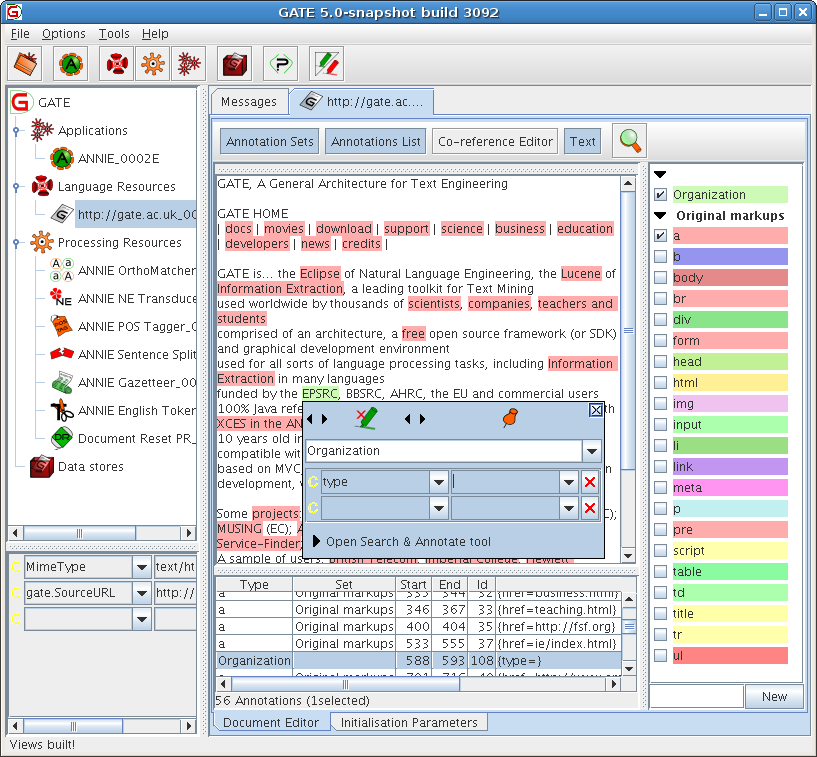
GATE 5 main window.

The screenshot shows the document viewer used to display a document and its annotations. In pink are <a> hyperlink annotations from an HTML file. The right list is the annotation sets list, and the bottom table is the annotation list. In the center is the annotation editor window.

== GATE Mímir ==
GATE generates vast quantities of information including; natural language text, semantic annotations, and ontological information. Sometimes the data itself is the end product of an application but often the information would be more useful if it could be efficiently searched. GATE Mimir provides support for indexing and searching the linguistic and semantic information generated by such applications and allows for querying the information using arbitrary combinations of text, structural information, and SPARQL.

== See also ==
- Unstructured Information Management Architecture (UIMA)
- OpenNLP
- Pheme, a major EU project managed by the GATE group on early detection of false information in social media
