= Search analytics =

Search analytics is the use of search data to investigate particular interactions among web searchers, the search engine, or the content during searching episodes. The resulting analysis and aggregation of search engine statistics can be used in search engine marketing (SEM) and search engine optimization (SEO). In other words, search analytics helps website owners understand and improve their performance on search engines based on the outcome. For example, identifying highly valuable site visitors or understanding user intent. Search analytics includes search volume trends and analysis, reverse searching (entering websites to see their keywords), keyword research, search result and advertisement history, advertisement spending statistics, website comparisons, affiliate marketing statistics, multivariate ad testing, etc.

== Data collection ==
Search analytics data can be collected in several ways. Search engines provide access to their own data with services such as Google Analytics, Google Trends, and Google Insights. Third-party services must collect their data from ISP's, phoning home software, or from scraping search engines. Getting traffic statistics from ISP's and phone homes provides for broader reporting of web traffic in addition to search analytics. Services that perform keyword monitoring only scrape a limited set of search results, depending on their clients' needs. Services providing reverse search, however, must scrape a large set of keywords from the search engines, usually in the millions, to find the keywords that everyone is using.

Since search results, especially advertisements, differ depending on where you are searching from, data collection methods have to account for geographic location. Keyword monitors do this more easily since they typically know what location their client is targeting. However, to get an exhaustive reverse search, several locations need to be scraped for the same keyword.

== Accuracy ==
Search analytics accuracy depends on service being used, data collection method, and data freshness. Google releases its own data, but only in an aggregated way and often without assigning absolute values such as number of visitors to its graphs. ISP logs and phone home methods are accurate for the population they sample, so sample size and demographics must be adequate to accurately represent the larger population. Scraping results can be highly accurate, especially when looking at the non-paid, organic search results.

Paid results, from Google Ads for example, are often different for the same search depending on the time, geographic location, and history of searches from a particular computer. This means that scraping advertisers can be hit or miss.

== Market conditions ==
Taking a look at Google Insights to gauge the popularity of these services shows that compared to searches for the term AdWords (Google's popular search ad system), use of search analytics services is still very low, around 1-25% as of Oct. 2009. This could point to a large opportunity for the users and makers of search analytics given that services have existed since 2004 with several new services being started since.

== Calculations ==
Sessions with Search = The number of sessions that used your site's search function at least once.
Percentage of sessions that used internal search = Sessions with Search / Total Sessions.
Total Unique Searches = The total number of times your site search was used. This excludes multiple searches on the same keyword during the same session.
Results Pageviews / Search = Pageviews of search result pages / Total Unique Searches.
Search Exits = The number of searches made immediately before leaving the site.
Percentage of Search Exits = Search Exits / Total Unique Searches
Search Refinements = The number of times a user searched again immediately after performing a search.
Percentage Search Refinements = The percentage of searches that resulted in a search refinement. Calculated as Search Refinements / Pageviews of search result pages.
Time after Search = The amount of time users spend on your site after performing a search. This is calculated as Sum of all search_duration across all searches / (search_transitions + 1)
Search Depth = The number of pages viewed after performing a search. This is calculated as Sum of all search_depth across all searches / (search_transitions + 1)

== See also ==
- Data analysis
- Digital marketing – Marketing of products or services using digital technologies or digital tools
- Search engine scraping – Process of harvesting data from search engine results pages
