= Jill Whalen =

Search engine optimizer

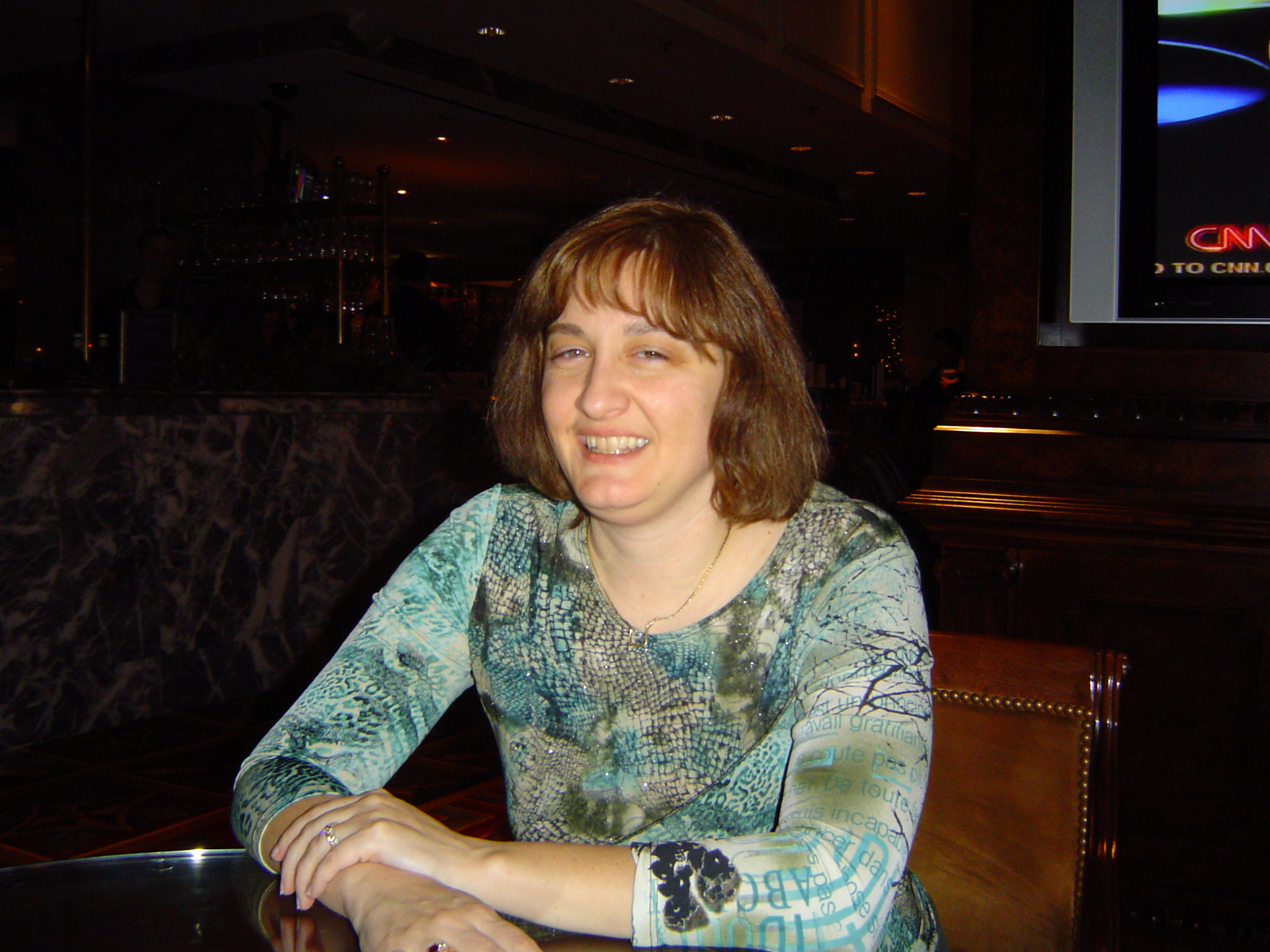
- Born: Framingham, Massachusetts
- Education: University of Massachusetts Amherst
- Website: http://jill.consulting/

Jill Whalen was an Ashland, Massachusetts based former search engine optimization consultant (SEO), speaker and writer.

Whalen was the CEO of High Rankings, and co-founded Search Engine Marketing New England. She was a regular speaker at Search Engine Strategies Conferences. High Rankings included a top-rated SEO discussion forum.

Whalen has been quoted as an authority by major publications including The Wall Street Journal, and Inc. She has also written search engine optimization articles for business websites including ClickZ and Search Engine Land, and her work on search engines is shared in marketing programs focused on attracting new clients.

== Early life and education ==
Whalen grew up in Framingham, Massachusetts and graduated from the University of Massachusetts Amherst with a degree in sociology.

== Career ==
Whalen started a chat room for parents when her three children were young, and the chat room became popular with other parents. As more people joined in her forum, they sought her help in developing websites for other forums. Whalen taught herself how to set up websites that would be found with search engines based on the keywords on the website. In 1998, she talked about her company Web Whiz, which provided guidance on making web sites early in the period of internet browsing. By 2007, the company was providing services helping companies improve their websites and website rankings, and she was running an online newsletter, a free forum, and sharing tips in magazines all with the goal of helping people with websites.

She was interviewed for the 2017 movie on search engine optimization: SEO: The Movie, where she described optimizing search as a means to improve marketing for a company.

She founded the search engine optimisation company High Rankings, serving clients including the Discovery Channel Procter & Gamble, and Geico. In 2003, she described how she was able to negotiate the terms she wanted in contracts with companies seeking the services of her company, and discussed how her company improves websites to maximize web traffic and search engine hits.

== Retirement and family life ==
Whalen announced her retirement from search engine optimization in 2013. She lived in Ashland, Massachusetts with her husband and three children. She died on June 9, 2025 after a short battle with cancer according to her daughter.
