= Brand24 =

Polish online media monitoring company

Brand 24 S.A.

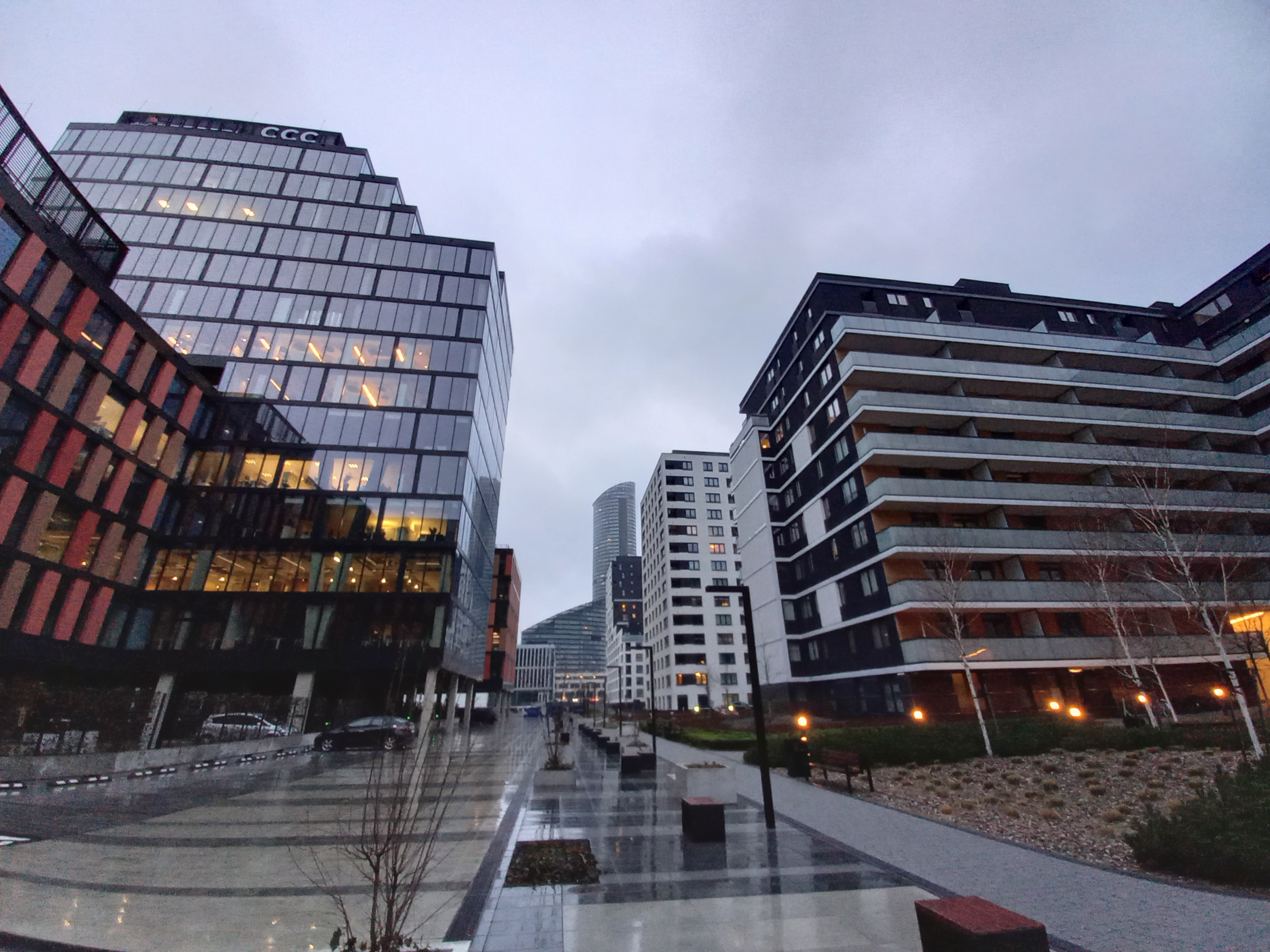
- Brand24 headquarters in Wrocław
- Type: Public company
- Traded as: WSE: B24
- Industry: Enterprise software; Software development; Media intelligence; Digital marketing; Social media marketing
- Founded: September 6, 2011; 14 years ago
- Founder: Michał Sadowski; Dawid Szymański; Piotr Wierzejewski; Karol Wnukiewicz
- Headquarters: MidPoint71, ul. Powstańców Śląskich 9, Wrocław, Poland
- Area served: Worldwide
- Key people: Michał Sadowski (CEO); Piotr Wierzejewski (CTO); Bartosz Kozłowski (CFO)
- Products: Brand24; Insights24; Brand Assistant; Brand Monitoring; Chatbeat
- Services: Media monitoring; Social media mining; Social media intelligence; Social marketing intelligence; Data analysis; Sentiment analysis; Social media analytics; Reputation management
- Revenue: ▲PLN 35.28M (2024)
- Operating income: ▼PLN 27,000 (2024)
- Net income: ▼PLN 764,000 (2024)
- Total assets: ▼PLN 25.35M (2024)
- Total equity: ▲PLN 11.41M (2024)
- Number of employees: ▲94 (2025)
- Parent: Semrush
- Website: brand24.com

Brand24 is a Polish company founded in 2011, headquartered in Wrocław, Poland, that specializes in media monitoring and analyzing content on the internet, through its own analytical software based on artificial intelligence. The company is publicly traded on the Warsaw Stock Exchange, and is currently majority-owned by Prowly, a subsidiary of the American search engine metrics provider Semrush.

The company's flagship namesake tool, available in over 150 countries, collects and analyzes public mentions of brands, products, and threads containing monitored keywords across news sites, social media, blogs, and discussion forums. As of late 2025, Brand24 monitors 100,000 brands, having collected 25 billion mentions to date.

== History ==
=== First online ventures ===
In 2005, Michał Sadowski, Dawid Szymański, Piotr Wierzejewski, and Karol Wnukiewicz, students of computer science and management at the Wrocław University of Science and Technology, launched a social networking site Polatach.pl [Polish for: After Years], a platform for reconnecting with old school friends (later outclassed by Nasza Klasa). They also founded a price comparison website Finansosfera.pl.

Wierzejewski's idea led to the creation of Patrz.pl [Polish for: Look!], a website enabling the posting and playback of short videos (similar to YouTube founded at the same time). By the end of 2007, with several million monthly users of Patrz.pl, the partners sold it for nearly PLN 2 million to CR Media Consulting, which incorporated it to its portal Pino.pl. From 2008, Sadowski, Wierzejewski, and Wnukiewicz took over management of Grupa Pino, operating a dozen of websites, including a video-sharing site PinoTV, a microblogging platform Moblo.pl, and a slide-hosting site Slajdzik.pl.

To monitor user feedback on its websites, Grupa Pino used Google Alerts, but its managers sought for a more comprehensive tool.

=== Turn to media monitoring ===
In May 2007, CR Media Consulting merged with Internet Group. The latter filed for bankruptcy in August 2010. Meanwhile, Sadowski, Wierzejewski, Wnukiewicz, and Szymański worked on a proprietary solution to collect and synthesize data on brands, products, and services from all available online searches.

In the summer of 2011, the four partners launched a prototype of a monitoring tool named Brand24, which updated every few minutes. It measured monthly Unique users or website views, as well as followers or contacts on social media. In August 2011, during beta testing with 1,000 users, the publicly traded company CAM Media (later rebranded to Larq) acquired a 30-percent stake in Brand24 the company.

On September 12, 2011, it began selling the Brand24 system. By the end of the year, 62 customers were using it. According to a blogger, the tool stood out for its quality of workmanship and clear interface. The social-listening technology of a young startup was already being adopted by national media outlets and researchers who analyzed online brand presence, through quantity and quality of discussions about Poland's supermarket chains, and banks.

In April 2012, an angel investor of an investment-fund group Altus acquired a 5% stake in Brand24 for PLN 200,000, valuing the startup at PLN 4 million. In 2013, its customer base exceeded 300.

=== International expansion ===
In March 2013, Brand24 began its international expansion with the Indonesian market, and in 2014, an updated version of the monitoring tool became available in the U.S. and Germany. In 2015, the global version of Brand24 was used in over 20 countries. It differed from the Polish, focused on the "Polish Internet," in parameters, functions, and data collection method. The international version collected and stored data from across the internet.

In the fall of 2015, amongst Brand24's first 1,000 international companies, was a brand strategy agency that ran Michelle Obama office's public-awareness campaign Better Make Room.

In December 2015, the investment fund Inovo invested PLN 1.4 million in Brand24, in exchange for a 5% stake, valuing the company at PLN 28 million. In January 2016, Venture Inc. a fund owned by the creators of LiveChat, invested in an 11.5% stake in Brand24. Mariusz Ciepły, the CEO of LiveChat Software (later rebranded to Text) joined Brand24's supervisory board. In September 2017, of nearly 2,000 customers from 85 countries, 63 percent were from Poland. With PLN 5.38 million in net revenue, the company reported a net loss of PLN 389,000.

=== Listing at the New Connect ===
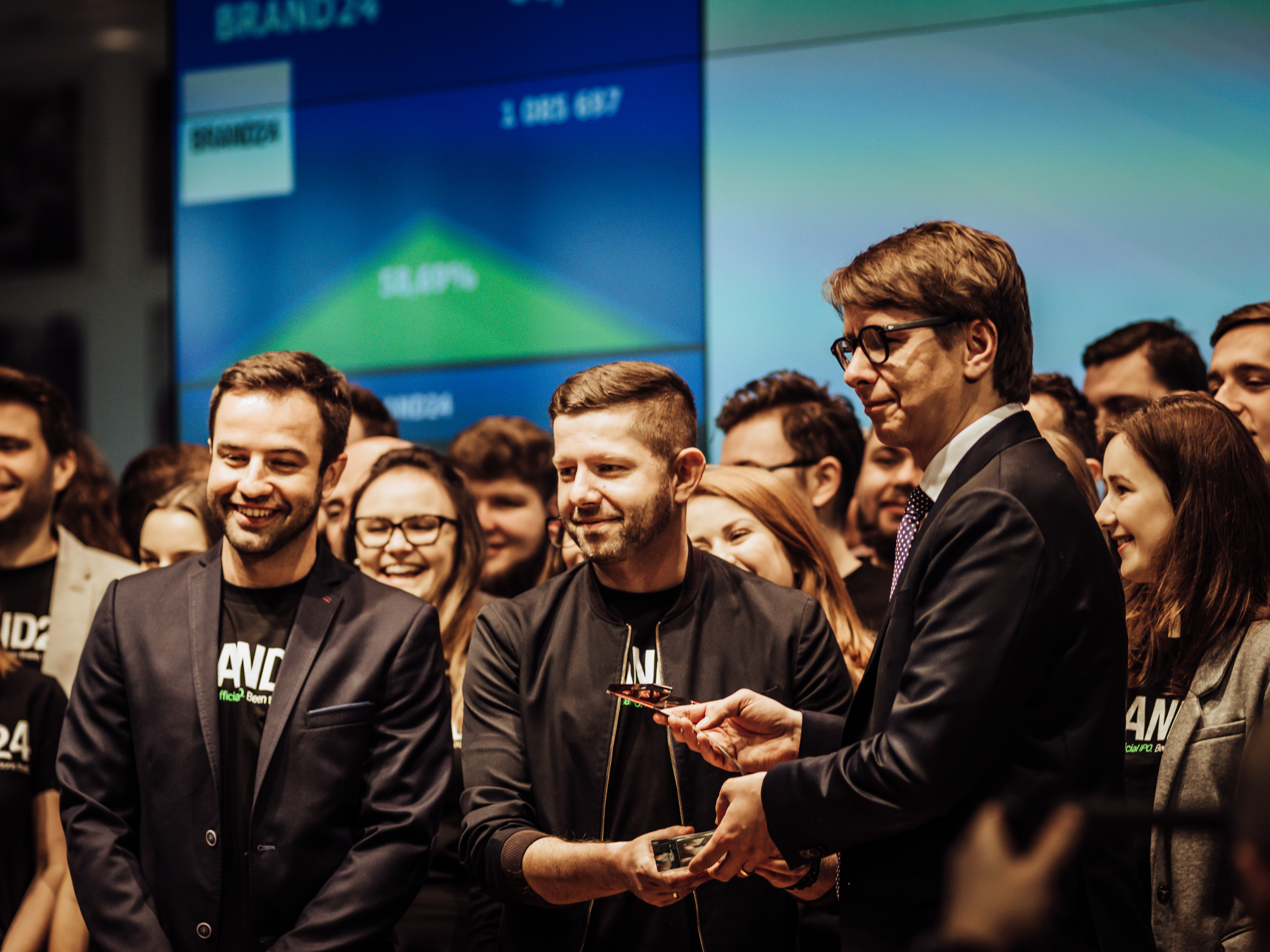
Michał Sadowski and Piotr Wierzejewski of Brand24 during the company debut on the NewConnect market, accompanied by Michał Cieciórski of GPW. January 2018.

By the end of 2017, through a pre-IPO transaction, the company raised PLN 3.5 million, valuing at PLN 60 million. On January 30, 2018, Brand24 debuted on the NewConnect market. The company's valuation exceeded PLN 90 million. It employed 60 people in five offices in Poland.

By the end of 2018, the tool monitored 50,000 keywords in nearly 100 countries, for over 3,000 clients including Intel, Carlsberg, IKEA, Raiffeisen Polbank, H&M, Vichy, GlaxoSmithKline, and Crédit Agricole. The tool Brand24 was being recognized by Gazeta Wyborcza as "one of the most important and best in the world."

=== Facebook blocks Brand24 ===
In April 2018, following articles covering the Cambridge Analytica scandal, the company Facebook (later rebranded to Meta) changed its data access policies for its social media platforms Facebook and Instagram, restricting API access. Sadowski expressed Brand24's willingness to comply with the new rules. In August 2019, an article in the US edition of Business Insider accused Brand24 of collecting excessive amounts of data from Instagram profiles for internet monitoring, using Brand24's own crawlers, in violation of the Instagram's terms and conditions.

The article also discussed other companies, including Cambridge Analytica, that potentially abused Facebook's API by using data scraping, as well as automatic identification and data capture, for details officially unavailable including Instagram avatars, user locations, passwords, and ephemeral content of Instastories. Following the article's publication, Facebook the company preventively blocked Brand24's accounts on Facebook and Instagram, as well as Sadowski's private profiles, demanding confirmation of compliance with the terms and conditions, and conducting an audit of its sensitive data. Brand24 disabled data monitoring from these services. Sadowski claimed on YouTube that this was a misunderstanding and that he was addressing the matter with Facebook representatives.

As a result of the lockdown, Brand24 lost 8% of its customers, saw its publicly listed share price drop, and laid off more than a dozen of its 70-person staff. Brand24's revenue for 2019 reached PLN 13.37 million, a 14.6% decrease compared to 2018. By the end of 2019, the company had over 3,000 customers, over 50% of whom were international.

In March 2020, the company reached an agreement with Facebook which restored Brand24's access to its accounts, Sadowski's personal profiles, advertising accounts, and API access. To comply with Facebook's new, stricter policies, Brand24 changed its access only to public mentions via the official API.

=== Warsaw Stock Exchange ===
In late 2019, Brand24 started monitoring TikTok, and the gaming platform Twitch. In January 2020, it started monitoring podcasts, and in May 2020, newsletters. By the end of 2020, the company had broken even. On May 11, 2021, Brand24 debuted on the main market of the Warsaw Stock Exchange.

The company then launched tests of its Custom Reports analytical service, which created reports based on data processed by its analytics department. These reports allowed for the evaluation of marketing campaigns and comparison of effectiveness with market benchmarks and competitors. In 2021, the company launched the service as Insights24.

In 2022, Brand24 launched a simplified version of its tool on the platform Semrush Marketplace. In March 2022, the tool began monitoring messaging channels on Telegram. The company ended 2024 with consolidated revenue of PLN 35.3 million.

=== Acquisition by Semrush ===
In April 2024, controlling shares in Brand24 were acquired by a media relations software provider Prowly, a Polish company owned by Brand24's American business partner, a marketing tool provider Semrush. Prowly became the majority shareholder of Brand24 in a transaction worth PLN 55 million. The acquired team remained in place. Brand24's capitalization on the WSE was increased to PLN 110 million. In March 2025, Prowly announced its intention to purchase the remaining shares for over PLN 26 million.

Since 2024, Brand24 has been building a tool Chatbeat, dedicated to measuring brand visibility in large language models, using data provided by Semrush. The two companies jointly launched a virtual Brand Assistant that simplified and accelerated the analysis of data from selected brands and competitors, providing consumer knowledge, conclusions and recommendations for further actions of global brands.

As of October 2025, Brand24 monitored 100,000 brands, having collected 25 billion mentions to date. According to online advertising and marketing specialists, the tool was revolutionizing companies' approach to online reputation management and stood out from other brand monitoring tools, especially in data-driven marketing. In November 2025, Adobe Inc. announced its agreement to acquire Semrush for $1.9 billion.

== Technology ==
=== Features of the flagship tool ===
Brand24
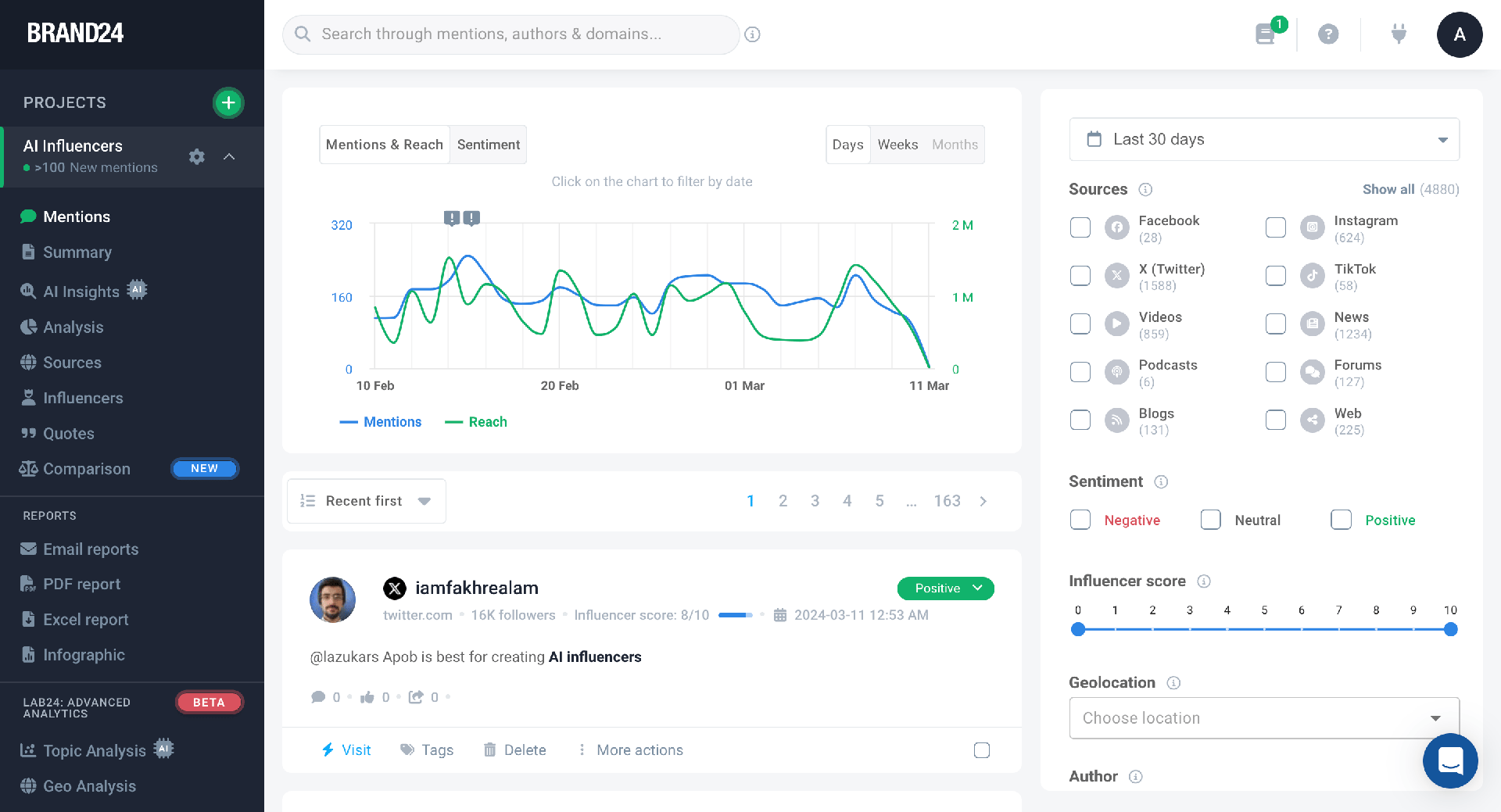
- Example dashboard inside Brand24
- Developer: Brand24 S.A.
- Release: September 12, 2011; 14 years ago
- Engine: Media monitoring service
- Operating system: Microsoft Windows; MacOS
- Type: Media monitoring; Data analysis; Sentiment analysis; Social media analytics
- Website: brand24.com

Brand24 is a comprehensive keyword monitoring tool for various online communication channels: social media, news sites, blogs, videos, forums, podcasts, review sites, and other online sources.

The tool specializes in assessing the sentiment of content about a given brand, product, and topic. It leverages machine learning algorithms and NLP techniques to analyze text data. Used in brand image research, it helps assess and manage a brand's online reputation by collecting and structuring user-generated information. It allows you to track key industry trends, issues impacting customers and consumers, and examine customer expectations of a given company.

By monitoring sudden increases in reach or mentions, it allows marketers to identify influential social media users who have the power to shape consumer opinions by discussing a brand, company, or specific topic. It helps prevent crises by providing notifications about negative content. It can also be used as a basis for sentiment analysis in the context of politics, including the perception of election campaigns among specific groups.

Brand24 measures the effectiveness of marketing campaigns based on over twenty indicators, including the Share of voice (based on the number of brand mentions), brand Presence Score (popularity of a topic at a given moment), sentiment analysis (emotional character of mentions of a given topic) – as well as by analyzing emotions, the participation of a given topic in the discussion, and analyzing the use of emoticons.

=== How the system works ===
Brand24 tools, available globally in a SaaS model, execute monitoring and report generation based on the analysis of public mentions. They notify users of new results and archive monitoring data.

Data collection is performed using web crawlers, official social media APIs, and specialized intermediaries that gather public mentions (including APIs from other search engines). As a result, the system creates and presents snippets of monitored content. The tool updates the list of mentions at various frequencies: twice a day, every hour, every 30 minutes – or in real time, when the system immediately notifies users when a given piece of information is published, via the web and mobile apps.

In April 2023, Brand24 was developing two proprietary AI engines, teaching algorithms to accurately analyze sentiment and properly interpret the language and emotions of publications, to be able to offer not only tools for collecting data, but also for drawing conclusions and recommending specific customer actions.

=== Advanced analytics ===
Independent reviews describe Brand24 as a social listening and media monitoring platform that provides analytics for interpreting online mentions, including sentiment and other insight features. Third-party descriptions also note topic analysis functionality that groups or surfaces what people discuss around a monitored term, supporting trend interpretation.

Reviews further mention influencer-related functionality (eg. influencer tracking, identifying influential voices) to help users find prominent authors or accounts in monitored conversations. Separately, reviewers and user feedback describe alerting based on unusual increases in activity (eg. email alerts triggered when mention volume crosses a threshold), which can help users notice sudden spikes that may require rapid response.

== Related Apps ==
In addition to the flagship tool, Brand24 is developing its parallel extensions:

- Insights24 – an analytical tool that generates reports based on data collected online, introduced in 2021.
- Brand Assistant – allows to break down online conversations around a chosen brand-related topic and its impact on key related threads.
- Brand Monitoring – an application for SEO specialists, to create advanced reports and press releases, created in partnership with Semrush.
- Chatbeat – measures brand visibility and positioning in texts generated by AI language models. Available since 2024, it estimates a brand's exposure to chatbot queries that are most relevant to it.

== Research and development ==
In July 2020, Brand24 the company developed a neural network-based content filtering mechanism that makes it easier for Brand24 users to review mentions of their brands. A relevance filter was created, which preserves the essence of mentions and allows for quick viewing of the most relevant results. The mechanism evaluates each mention based on sentiment, source popularity, and category weight.

Between 2021 and 2023, the company built artificial intelligence algorithms that interpret brand content published online. Its flagship product, Brand24, was expanded to include multilingual text analysis and models analyzing multimodal data. The company received PLN 3.8 million in EU funding for research and implementation. In January 2023, Brand24 launched a new version of its proprietary AI sentiment analysis model, increasing its effectiveness in identifying positive and negative mentions from 64% to 84%, across over 100 languages.

== Social engagement ==
=== Awareness campaign on the misnomer ===
In January 2017, on the 72nd anniversary of the liberation of the Auschwitz-Birkenau concentration camp, Brand24 launched a social awareness campaign Help Remember (Pomóż Pamiętać), dedicated to the use of the incorrect phrase "Polish death camps." A dedicated website featured an up-to-date stream from across the internet, highlighting current online usage of the phrase in 16 languages. Through the website, any internet user could access the source, verify the context of the phrase's use, and report it to the article's author or publisher.

=== Efforts against disinformation ===
In February 2022, Brand24 launched a campaign to detect and report pro-Russian trolls. The company shared its monitoring tools with organizations that conduct fact-checking and coordinate aid for Ukraine and refugees to identify and block accounts and bots spreading lies about the war in Ukraine.

Brand24 created a dedicated website and public profile where it publishes warnings about fake news and disinformation, encourages people to react and report suspicious content, and exposes the bot profiles that fuel them.

=== Leadership ===
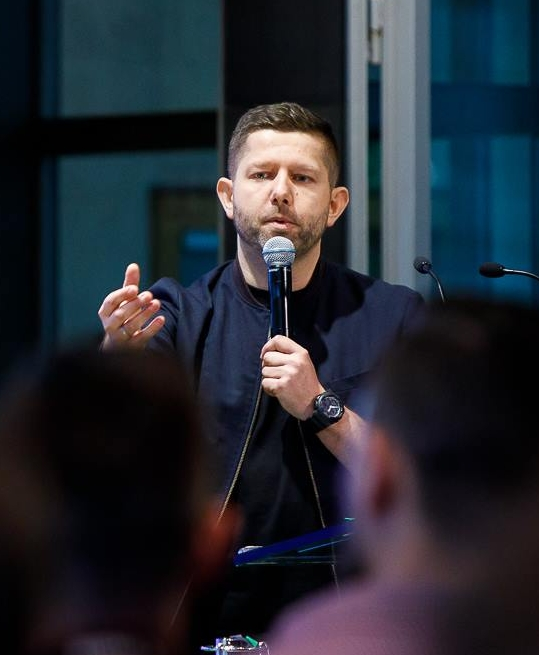
Michał Sadowski of Brand24 in 2018

Michał Sadowski is Brand24's CEO. In December 2012, he published the book Rewolucja social media ("The Social Media Revolution"). In May 2017, together with Mick Griffin he launched a video guide for entrepreneurs.

Since September 2020, Sadowski has hosted his own Business Podcast, dedicated to running an online business, marketing, sales, and customer service. On his YouTube channel, he interviews entrepreneurs about business, sales, and marketing.

== Awards and accolades ==
In 2012, the company took first place in the ranking Ekomersy, in the Best Debut category, and was one of the winners of the Aulery competition for the best startup. In the 2013 edition of The Next Web's competition, Brand24 was recognized as Poland's Best Web App, and Sadowski as Best Co-Founder. In the Mobile Trends Awards 2013, the company won the award for the best mobile application for businesses.

In 2014, in the Mobile Trends Awards, the Brand24 application won the title of Best App for Business. In 2018, the company was recognized as a High Performer in Social Media Monitoring Apps in the G2 Crowd Awards. In 2017 and 2018, Brand24 was included in the Deloitte Technology Fast 500 EMEA ranking.
