= Stephan Spencer =

American author and podcaster

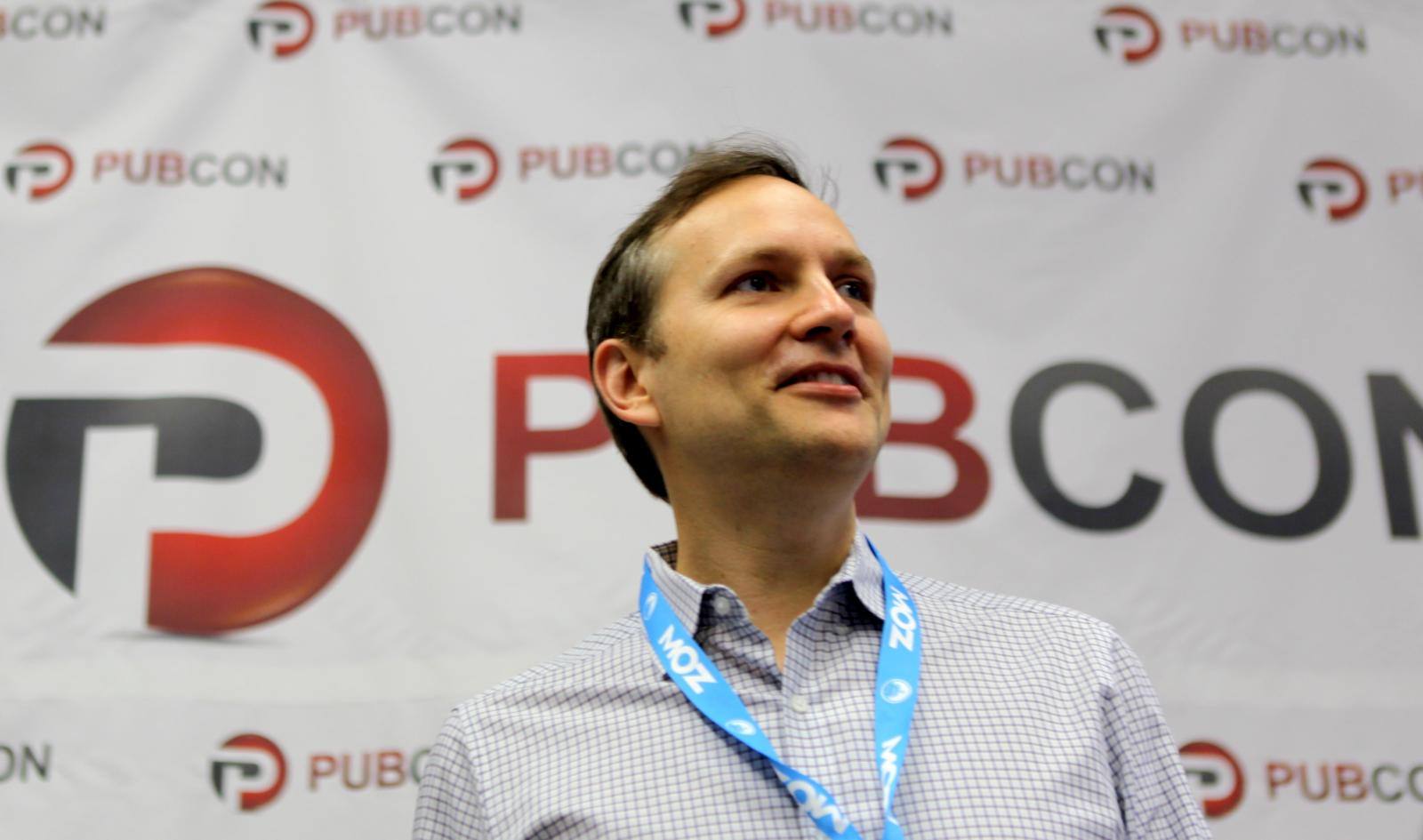
- Stephan at Pubcon 2014, Las Vegas

Stephan Spencer is a three-time author under the O'Reilly Media brand, search engine optimization (SEO) expert, inventor, podcaster, speaker, and founder of Netconcepts.

== Early career ==
Spencer holds an M.S. in Biochemistry from the University of Wisconsin-Madison. In his PhD study, he worked in the Institute for Molecular Virology and Department of Biochemistry where he developed improved visual representations of biological viruses. Spencer served as research assistant on a project researching ways to improve communication about virology on the World Wide Web. He presented a paper on this topic at the Second International Worldwide Web Conference, where he met some of the team from Netscape and got interested in web development. In 1994, while still in graduate school, Spencer developed his first website. Spencer left his PhD study to pursue a career in Internet marketing.

=== WritersNet ===
Spencer founded WritersNet in 1994 while a graduate student. WritersNet was acquired by CrowdGather in June 2011. In January 2008, a lawsuit was filed against Spencer as the founder of WritersNet by literary agent Barbara Bauer, who simultaneously filed suit against the Wikimedia Foundation, the Science Fiction and Fantasy Writers of America Inc, and over a dozen other parties on the legal claims of defamation, conspiracy, and tortious interference. Wikimedia Foundation was removed from the suit in May 2008, and the suit itself was dismissed in November 2010.

=== InnSite ===
Spencer also founded InnSite while a grad student in 1994. InnSite was an early implementer of real-time updatable user-generated content, and was featured in the book Special Edition: Using CGI published by Que in 1996. InnSite was named "Best Inn Directory of 1998" by Yahoo! Internet Life magazine. InnSite was acquired by an undisclosed party in 2010.

== Netconcepts ==
In 1995, Spencer founded web design agency Netconcepts on a bootstrap budget in Madison, Wisconsin. The agency provided Internet consulting, an ecommerce platform called GravityMarket and an email marketing platform GravityMail with automated spam scoring. However, over time it grew to specialize in search engine optimization.

=== New Zealand ===
In 2000, Spencer moved to New Zealand to set up a second Netconcepts branch in Auckland. He acted as managing director from a smaller office in Christchurch while the Wisconsin office continued to operate as headquarters. The company used an internal intranet to collaborate between offices. Netconcepts grew to over 40 employees between the two offices, with yearly revenue of over $5 million, making it one of the largest SEO firms in New Zealand. However, clients were typically US-based, and included corporations such as Verizon, Home Shopping Network, and REI. The firm received recognition for its flexible hours and employee-centric working environment, including from the New Zealand Government. His operation in New Zealand had notably high staff retention rates. Spencer moved from New Zealand back to the US in 2007.

=== Acquisition by Covario ===
Netconcepts was acquired by Covario in 2010. Spencer worked as Vice President of SEO Strategies at Covario in 2010 for less than a year after the acquisition was finalized.

=== GravityStream ===
Spencer is the inventor of the pay-for-performance SEO technology platform GravityStream, was included in the acquisition of Covario and now part of Rio SEO's toolset.

=== Post-Acquisition ===
Spencer now works as an SEO and internet marketing consultant and has worked with clients such as Zappos, Chanel, and Sony.

Spencer is on the advisory board to CrowdGather, and board member to Impact Network, a charity that builds and operates schools in Zambia. In 2008, Spencer worked with Jimmy Carter's humanitarian organization, The Carter Center, to set up a successful blog.

== Writing ==
In 2009, Spencer co-authored The Art of SEO, with Rand Fishkin, Eric Enge, and Jessie Stricchiola. Published by O'Reilly, the book was named Search Engine Land's Best SEO Book of 2009. Spencer and his co-authors came out with the second edition of The Art of SEO in 2012, and the third edition in 2015. Spencer is author of Google Power Search, an advanced Google search manual, published in 2011 by O'Reilly. Spencer co-authored Social eCommerce with Jimmy Harding and Jennifer Sheahan which was published in 2014 by O'Reilly.

Spencer is a contributor to a number of marketing journals and blogs. He has been published in Practical Ecommerce, MarketingProfs, Search Engine Land, Multichannel Merchant, The Huffington Post, and CNET, among others.

=== Bibliography ===
- Enge, Eric, Stephan Spencer, Jessie Stricchiola, and Rand Fishkin. The Art of SEO: Mastering Search Engine Optimization. N.p.: O'Reilly & Associates, 2009. ISBN 0596518862
- Enge, Eric, Stephan Spencer, Jessie Stricchiola, and Rand Fishkin. The Art of SEO: Mastering Search Engine Optimization. 2nd ed. N.p.: O'Reilly & Associates, 2012. ISBN 1449304214
- Enge, Eric, Stephan Spencer and Jessie Stricchiola. The Art of SEO: Mastering Search Engine Optimization. 3rd ed. N.p.: O'Reilly & Associates, 2015. ISBN 1491948965
- Spencer, Stephan. Google Power Search. N.p.: O'Reilly & Associates, 2009. ISBN 1449311563
- Spencer, Stephan, Jimmy Harding, Jennifer Sheahan. Social eCommerce: Increasing Sales and Extending Brand Reach. N.p.: O'Reilly & Associates, 2014. ISBN 1449366368

== Speaking ==
Spencer has been speaking at Internet marketing conferences for over 20 years, including covering SEO and digital marketing topics for the American Marketing Association (AMA), Shop.org, Internet Retailer, SMX, Search Engine Strategies, O'Reilly/TechWeb, PubCon, NEMOA, Etail, WordCamp, ACCM, among others.

== Media ==
Spencer is the host of two podcasts, Marketing Speak and The Optimized Geek. Both have appeared on iTunes New and Noteworthy and In 2016, Spencer made multiple live television appearances on local affiliates of ABC, CBS, FOX, and NBC, speaking about the geek lifestyle and raising awareness for children in foster care.

== Family ==
Spencer encouraged his oldest daughter at the age of 14 to start a blog, neopetsfanatic.com. He advised her on using AdSense to monetize the site, earnings were up to $1,100 per month. Spencer and Chloe have co presented at conferences DMA08 and BlogPaws. Chloe has spoken on her own as well, including BlogHer, DMA, YPulse, SMX West, BlogWorld, SMOC, and SES, and has appeared live on Denver 9News and the Bay Area's ABC7 News. BlogPaws has appeared on live TV as well. Spencer and Chloe have appeared on interviews such as blogtalkradio, as well as Chloe has appeared alone on WebProNews, ClickZ, ReelSEO, and Blogger Stories. In addition to encouraging Chloe to blog on her own site, he encouraged her to blog for The Huffington Post and, on his recommendation to Arianna Huffington, Chloe became a Huffington Post blogger at the age of 16 in 2008.
