= Cover-up =

Attempt to conceal evidence

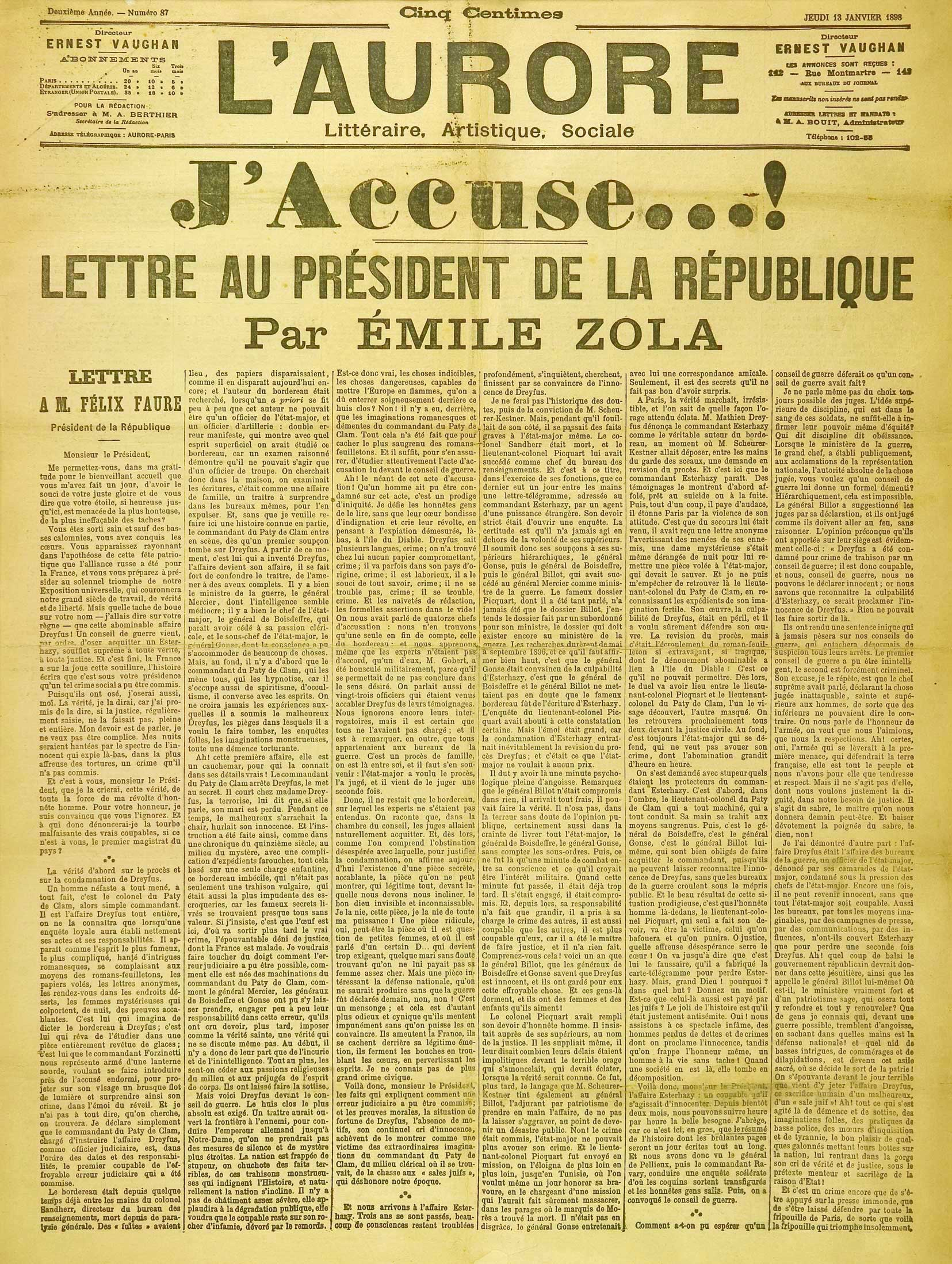
Front page of the newspaper L’Aurore of Thursday 13 January 1898, with the famous open letter J'Accuse…! written by Émile Zola to the President of France about the Dreyfus Affair. The headline reads "I accuse! Letter to the President of the Republic". See J'accuse...!, the whole text on Wikisource

A cover-up is an attempt, whether successful or not, to conceal evidence of wrongdoing, error, incompetence, or other embarrassing or criminalizing information. Research has distinguished personal cover-ups (covering up one's own misdeeds) from relational cover-ups (covering up someone else's misdeeds)

The expression is usually applied to people in positions of authority who abuse power to avoid or silence criticism or to deflect guilt of wrongdoing.

== Overview ==
A cover-up is an attempt, successful or not, to conceal or prevent discovery of information or evidence about a crime, mistake, or unethical actions, often to safeguard reputation. It differs from other unethical behavior as a reaction to earlier questionable behavior.

There are different types of coverup organized by the scale and motive for the cover-up. Personal cover-ups are intended to hide an individual's actions and relational cover-ups occur when someone attempts to conceal another person's actions. There are also institutional or organizational cover-ups where a group is involved, and multiagency where multiple institutions take part in a cover-up. Psychology professor Anthony Montgomery writes that there are "elements that are crucial for the development and maintenance of [organizational] cover-ups: (1) Unwilling, but compliant, participants who are unlikely to be whistleblowers, (2) Suppressing/withholding important information, (3) Proactively engaging the support of related actors/institutions that helps create a critical mass, (4) Owning the narrative, and (5) Moral disengagement."

== Examples ==
- The Dreyfus Affair
- Armenian genocide denial
- Katyn massacre
- The Iran–Contra affair
- The Luzhniki disaster
- The Chernobyl disaster
- The My Lai massacre
- The Roman Catholic sex abuse cases of the late 20th and early 21st centuries.
- The Watergate scandal
- Russian doping scandals
- Stormy Daniels–Donald Trump scandal

== See also ==
- Consciousness of guilt
- Gatekeepers
- Impression formation
- Lie
- Media manipulation
- Narcissistic defences
- Negative search
- Omertà
- Propaganda
- Spin (propaganda)
- Whitewashing (communications)
- Blue wall of silence
