= Netconcepts =

American web marketing and web development agency

Netconcepts is a web marketing and web development agency founded by Stephan Spencer and headquartered in Madison, Wisconsin. Netconcepts specializes in SEO for Fortune 500 ecommerce companies and major media brands.

Netconcepts was acquired in January 2010 by Covario, which was then the nation's largest independent SEM (search engine marketing) and SEO (search engine optimization) solutions provider, offering both software and marketing services for paid and organic search management. Covario was itself acquired in 2014 by Dentsu Aegis, a multinational media and digital marketing communications company.

Netconcepts was relaunched in 2021 when the name became available again.

== Overview ==
In 1995, the web development company Internet Concepts LLC was founded by its president Stephan Spencer, eventually renaming itself to Netconcepts LLC.

In 2000, A New Zealand office, Netconcepts Ltd., was opened by Spencer in Browns Bay, Auckland and then later, Christchurch. Netconcepts Ltd. was the design and production arm of Netconcepts LLC, the office in Madison. The majority of the over 50 staff wereemployed in the New Zealand office though some of the owners and key executives were based in Madison. The company was featured in a case study by the New Zealand Government's Work-Life Balance Project.

Netconcepts had many large corporate American clients which totaled 70% of their client list, the other 30% were New Zealand-based clients. In 2005, Netconcepts earned $5 million in revenue. Some of the American clients included the Carter Center, PartStore.com, Verizon, Van Dykes Taxidermy, Countrywide Financial, Steve Spangler, and Discovery Channel. New Zealand clients include New Zealand Post and Prime Television.

Netconcepts China was founded in 2008 and continues to operate, with headquarters in Beijing and offices in Shanghai, Chengdu and Jinan. Amazon China, Huawei and eBay are among their clients.

After acquiring Netconcepts LLC, Covario Inc. phased out use of the Netconcepts brand name. In 2021, Spencer relaunched Netconcepts when the name became available again.

In 2003, Netconcepts released a report titled The State of Search Engine Cataloging, which showed 99 of the then Catalog Age 100 companies had not optimized their website for search engines. The other company did not have a website. Brian Klais, vice-president of their e-business sector, and Stephan Spencer said to Multi Channel Merchant: "the vast majority of sites analyzed had sizable chunks of their site inaccessible to search engine spiders, mostly due to search-engine-unfriendly dynamic URLs and navigation based on Java, JavaScript, or Flash."

== White paper ==
Netconcepts released a white paper in 2006, detailing the aspect of long tail searches and the value of having them. The white paper says that the amount of unbranded keyword traffic is about seven million searches a month. A previous study showed that Google served up the most unbranded searches, 80.7%. Netconcepts then went into detail about how to optimize a website for long tail searches, such as changing from dynamic to static URLs so a search engine can index the page easier, rewrite title tags, and copy optimization.
