= Website audit =

Concept in search engine optimization

A website audit is a comprehensive evaluation of the factors that influence a website's visibility in search engines. It provides an overview of the site's structure, performance, traffic patterns, and the effectiveness of individual pages. Website audits are typically conducted for marketing and optimisation purposes, with the primary aim of identifying technical or strategic weaknesses that may hinder overall web performance.

== Description ==
The website audit starts with a general analysis of a website aimed at revealing the actions needed to improve search engine optimization (SEO). Many tools provide recommendations for improving website search rankings by conducting both on-page and off-page SEO audits. These audits typically identify issues such as broken links, duplicate meta descriptions and title tags, HTML validation errors, site performance metrics, error pages, indexed page counts, and overall site speed. A site audit is applicable for all online businesses and improves different aspects of the websites. Tools such as Semrush "Site Audit" also monitor how entities are referenced within responses generated by Large language model answer engines.

== Purpose ==
There are many reasons to do a website audit, but in most cases SEO and content marketing are the main ones. A website audit made for SEO purposes discovers weak spots in a website's SEO score and helps understand the state of SEO. Content audit is used to analyze the engagement and what changes have to be made to the content strategy to enhance the site's performance.

== Types ==
There are multiple types of site audits, including the following:

- Health audits - analyzing overall health of the website while revealing all issues that require immediate attention.
- Security audits - accessing a site for potential vulnerability issues such as high value sites and high-risk verticals.
- Competitive site audits - the ability to monitor all gaps and opportunities for website promotion, and detect the benefits and drawbacks of competitors.
- Red flag and recovery audits - analyzing a website for impending penalties and site metrics when there is an oncoming peril of algorithmic penalties.
- Conversion optimization audits - accessing a site for possible technical and onsite conversion problems.
- Image optimization - Image tag optimization helps search engines understand your images better, improving your site’s visibility in search results (especially Google Images).
- Technical SEO audits - this often involves crawling the entire site, beginning with a review of site content, structure, and adherence to best practices such as web accessibility.
- Link audit: A link audit assesses the quality and quantity of the links to the website. It looks for broken links, low-quality links, and backlinks from spammy websites.
- Content audit: evaluate your website's quality of content as well as its efficacy. It examines aspects like readability, relevancy as well as engagement.

All of these audits can be parts of one larger audit. The aim of these audits are to confirm that the system in place is secure, and if not, to identify issues so they can be corrected. These audits may include giving advice to the site owner. All website audits start with health audits.

== See also ==
- Technical audit
- Hyperlink
- Digital content
