= Ecomom =

Online retailer

- Industry: Retail
- Founded: 2006; 20 years ago
- Headquarters: Las Vegas and San Francisco
- Key people: Jody Sherman
- Products: Mother & Children

Ecomom was a brand founded by Kimberly Pinkson in 2006, with a focus on environmentally safe and healthy products for mothers and their children. It consisted of the non-profit education arm, EcoMom Alliance, and an affiliated e-commerce startup company co-founded by Jenny Orser and Chris de Tournay Birkhan. Its head offices were originally located in San Francisco before moving to Santa Monica. After an acquisition by Jody Sherman, and disagreements in management style, Pinkson was forced out and the company and the headquarters moved to Las Vegas.

After that, and due to numerous factors including mismanagement of funds, the suicide of Jody Sherman, and the company's low profit margins due to excessive discounting, Ecomom shut down in early 2013. Etailz Inc., formerly GreenCupboards, an e-commerce site specializing in environmentally friendly brands, acquired Ecomom in the same year. The website of Ecomom reopened in the early summer of 2013.

== Failure ==
In 2011, Ecomom adopted a deep discounting policy which offered customers fifty-percent discount. As a result, Ecomom lost money every time it sold products because half the price was lower than the cost price. In addition, Ecomom did not limit these discounts, so repeat customers could take advantage of the 50% discount when shopping. Ecomom spent excessively on marketing its products, for example, the expenditure for search engine marketing was not proportional to the return of investment. Ecomom's management did not understand that the abuse of the offered discount would have a negative impact on the company when developing new audiences and markets.

In addition to the low profit margins, Ecomom faced issues with investors. Rather than source income from a professional venture capitalist, Sherman received money in small chunks from wealthy individuals. This allowed him to run the business largely independently. However, due to the relative small stake of these investors in the company, none of them had a strong incentive to get closely involved and make the company a success. This further hurt Ecomom's viability as a business.
