= Search Engine Watch =

Digital marketing blog

- Available in: English
- Owner: Blenheim Chalcot
- Creator: Danny Sullivan
- Editors: Kamaljeet Kalsi (Commissioning & Production Editor, ClickZ & Search Engine Watch), Natasha Prayag (Head of Content)
- Website: searchenginewatch.com
- Launched: 1996; 30 years ago

Search Engine Watch (SEW) is a digital marketing website that provides news and analysis on search engines, search engine marketing, and search industry trends.

Search Engine Watch was started by Danny Sullivan in 1996. In 1997, Sullivan sold it for an undisclosed amount to Mecklermedia (now WebMediaBrands). In 2005, the website and related Search Engine Strategies conference series were sold to Incisive Media for $43 million. On November 30, 2006, Danny Sullivan left Search Engine Watch, after his resignation announcement on August 29, 2006. Rebecca Lieb was named editor-in-chief the following month.

In 2015, Incisive Media sold SES, Search Engine Watch, and ClickZ to Blenheim Chalcot.

Google's Matt Cutts has called Search Engine Watch "a must-read." Yahoo's Tim Mayer has said that it is the "most authoritative source on search."

== See also ==
- List of search engines
- Pay per click
