= SAScon =

The Search, Analytics and Social Media Conference (SASCon) was an annual UK marketing conference series focused on search engine marketing, social media marketing and search engine optimisation. The conference took place in Manchester over 2 days, and includes seminars, workshops and discussion panels. Venues have included Bridgewater Hall (2010), The Hive (2011–2012), and Manchester Metropolitan University Business School (2013–2014). The conference is no longer running.

== History ==
The conference was created by Richard Gregory, Simon Wharton, Pete Young, Peter Cobley, Ben McKay and Richard Hudson in 2009. Past keynote speakers include Mike Little, co-founder of WordPress.

== See also ==
- Search engine optimization
- Social media optimization
- Search engine marketing
- Search Engine Strategies
