= Aberdeen Strategy and Research =

Aberdeen
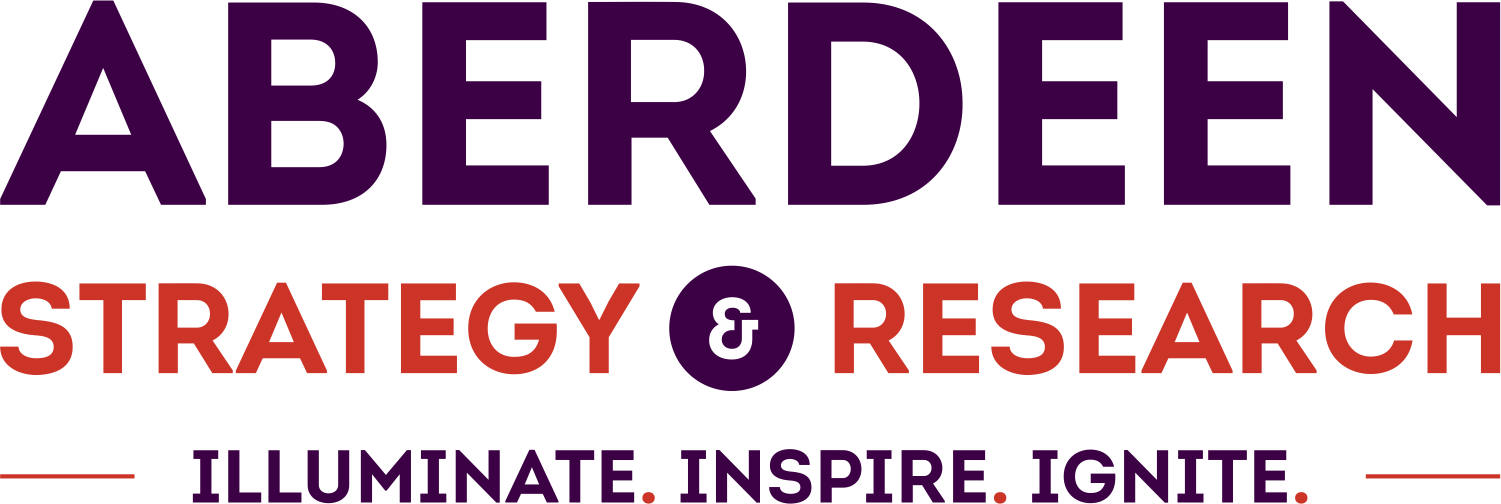
- Formerly: Aberdeen Group
- Type: Subsidiary
- Industry: Market Intelligence, Content Marketing Services, Research
- Founded: 1988
- Headquarters: Waltham, Massachusetts, United States
- Parent: Spiceworks Ziff Davis
- Website: aberdeen.com

Aberdeen is an international marketing intelligence company. Aberdeen's headquarters is based in Waltham, Massachusetts, United States, with an additional US office location in Wilton, CT, as well as three European offices in Versailles (France), Madrid (Spain), and Chertsey (United Kingdom).

== Company history ==
Aberdeen was originally founded in 1988 to use enterprise data to help businesses make business decisions by using data governance. Aberdeen has since been acquired by two different companies: Harte Hanks in September 2006 and later Halyard Capital in April 2015. The company initially provided technology industry data and predictive analytics for B2B marketers and sales teams, but as of 2018, provides targeted intent data for marketing and sales.

From 2016 to 2018 the Group partnered with Bombora, a provider of B2B demographic and intent-based data.

On October 30, 2017, Marc Osofsky became Aberdeen’s chief executive officer and a member of the board of managers; Gary Skidmore became the chairman of Aberdeen.

In December 2018, Aberdeen acquired The Big Willow, an intent data provider. The Big Willow gathers its data in part by tracking 3.7 billion device IDs across over 12 billion web pages.

The acquisition allowed Aberdeen to enhance its intent data offerings by being able to provide specific company locations and target contact titles. As part of the acquisition, The Big Willow CEO Charlie Tarzian became President and Chief Innovation Officer at Aberdeen, and The Big Willow COO Keith Blackwell became COO of Aberdeen.

On November 24, 2020, Spiceworks Ziff-Davis acquired Aberdeen Group.

== Products and methods ==
Aberdeen’s method combines online interactions (topic, keywords, PageURL, and Opt-in) with targeting data (company, location, contacts), and first-party visitor intelligence and win/loss history. Aberdeen has databases of opt-in users who have explicitly said that they are looking for certain technology and want to purchase in a specific time-frame. On blind tests run by clients, Aberdeen’s models achieved 91% accuracy in predicting purchase intent.

Business classifications in sector study reports range from "best performers" to "laggards".

In April 2019, Aberdeen announced 'Aberdeen Intent for Salesforce', a tool that works with Salesforce to improve sales.

== Research studies ==
The Aberdeen Group has conducted several surveys that have been used by multiple media outlets:

- Customer Retention
- Live Chat Support Cost Reductions
- Rebate Promotion Benefits
- Hiring Millennials through Social Media
- Engaged Employee Program Benefits

Some of the data Aberdeen collects and analyzes is available via different reports. One of Aberdeen’s reports, The Impact of Video Marketing, showed that marketers that used video content to engage potential customers grew their companies’ revenue 49% faster year-over-year than companies without video content. A further report, Understanding the Expanding Benefits of Marketing with Video, reported that video marketers get 66% more qualified leads per year and achieve a 54% increase in brand awareness. Another study focused on successful onboarding practices, and revealed that employees who attend a structured orientation program are more productive and engaged at work. The data was shared alongside information that the average U.S. employer spends $4,000 hiring someone new.
