= Organic search results =

Strictly algorithmic search results

In web search engines, organic search results are the query results which are calculated strictly algorithmically, and not affected by advertiser payments. They are distinguished from various kinds of sponsored results, whether they are explicit pay-per-click advertisements, shopping results, or other results where the search engine is paid either for showing the result, or for clicks on the result.

== Background ==
The Google, Yahoo!, Bing, and Sogou search engines insert advertising on their search results pages. In U.S. law, advertising must be distinguished from organic results. This is done with various differences in background, text, link colors, and/or placement on the page. However, a 2004 survey found that a majority of search engine users could not distinguish the two.

Because so few ordinary users realized that many of the highest placed "results" on search engine results pages (SERPs) were ads, the search engine optimization industry began to distinguish between ads and natural results. The perspective among general users was that all results were, in fact, "results." So the qualifier "organic" was invented to distinguish non-ad search results from ads. It has been used since at least 2004.

Because the distinction is important (and because the word "organic" has many metaphorical uses) the term is now in widespread use within the search engine optimization and web marketing industry. As of July 2009, the term "organic search" is now commonly used outside the specialist web marketing industry, even used frequently by Google (throughout the Google Analytics site, for instance).

Google claims their users click (organic) search results more often than ads, essentially rebutting the research cited above. A 2012 Google study found that 81% of ad impressions and 66% of ad clicks happen when there is no associated organic search result on the first page. Research has shown that searchers may have a bias against ads, unless the ads are relevant to the searcher's need or intent.

The same report and others going back to 1997 by Pew show that users avoid clicking "results" they know to be ads.

According to a June 2013 study by Chitika, 9 out of 10 searchers don't go beyond Google's first page of organic search results, a claim often cited by the search engine optimization (SEO) industry to justify optimizing websites for organic search. Organic SEO describes the use of certain strategies or tools to elevate a website's content in the "free" search results.

Users can prevent ads in search results and list only organic results by using browser add-ons and plugins. Other browsers may have different tools developed for blocking ads.

== See also ==
- Click-through rate
- Internet marketing
- List of Search Engines
- Search engine optimization
- Search engine results page
- Web page
- Web crawler
- Site map
