= Semrush =

American search engine metrics company

Semrush Holdings, Inc.
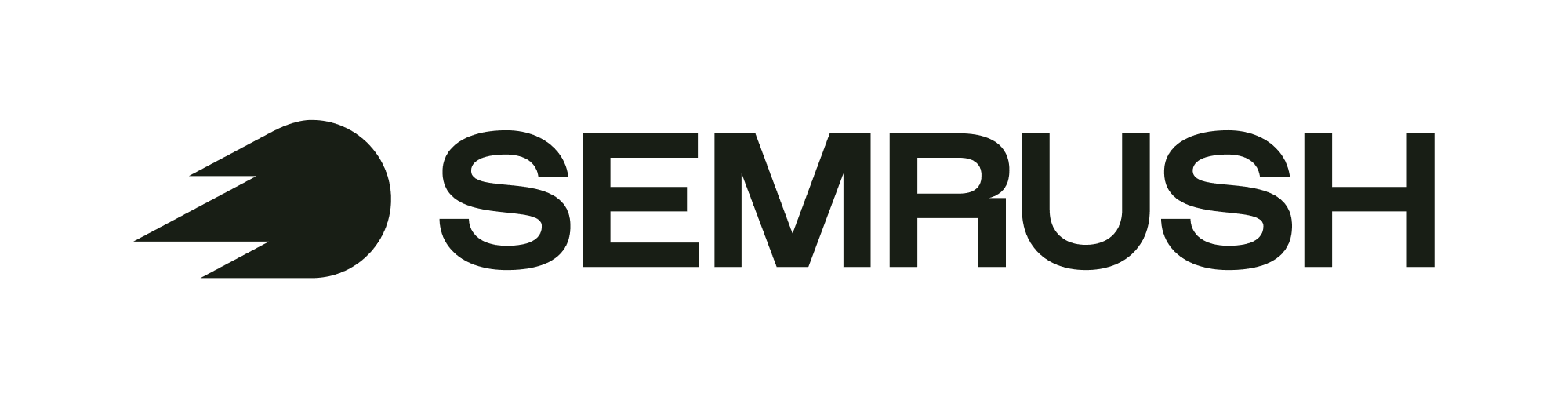
- Type: Subsidiary
- Industry: Digital marketing software
- Founded: 2008; 18 years ago
- Founders: Oleg Shchegolev; Dmitri Melnikov
- Headquarters: Boston, Massachusetts, United States
- Key people: Oleg Shchegolev (CTO); Andrew Warden (CMO); Brian Mulroy (CFO)
- Revenue: US$443.6 million (2025)
- Number of employees: ~1,600 (2024)
- Parent: Adobe Inc. (2026–present)
- Website: www.semrush.com

Semrush Holdings, Inc. is an American software company and wholly owned subsidiary of Adobe Inc. The company's platform provides tools for search engine optimization (SEO), AI search visibility, competitor analysis, content marketing, paid advertising, local SEO, website auditing, reporting, and third-party integrations.

It was released by Boston-based company Semrush Inc, founded by Oleg Shchegolev and Dmitri Melnikov.

As of 2025, the company has over 1000 employees and offices in Barcelona, Belgrade, Berlin, Yerevan, Limassol, Prague, Warsaw, Amsterdam, Boston, and Dallas. It went public in March 2021 and formerly traded on the NYSE under the ticker NYSE: SEMR until Adobe completed its acquisition in April 2026.

== History ==
Semrush was initially released as Seodigger before becoming a Firefox extension. It was later renamed SeoQuake Company in 2007, before adopting the name Semrush (SEM being an acronym for search engine marketing).

In April 2018, the company raised $40 million in a financing round co-led by venture capital firms Greycroft, E.ventures, and Siguler Guff, to support expansion across research platforms, including those associated with Amazon, Microsoft, and Baidu.

In December 2020, the company updated its visual identity and standardized its name from "SEMrush" to "Semrush".

Semrush completed an initial public offering in March 2021 and began trading on the New York Stock Exchange under the ticker symbol NYSE: SEMR. The company's S-1 filing reported $213 million in revenue and more than 82,000 customers.

The company’s founders are Russian and relocated to the United States in 2017. Following Russia's invasion of Ukraine in 2022, Semrush ceased operations in Russia and offered relocation support to affected staff. In 2024, Semrush acquired the assets of Datos and later acquired Ryte, a German SaaS company.

In March 2025, Bill R. Wagner became CEO, succeeding co-founder Oleg Shchegolev, who transitioned to Chief Technology Officer. In November 2025, Adobe Inc. announced an agreement to acquire Semrush for $1.9 billion. In February 2026, shareholders approved the proposed transaction at a virtual special meeting. Adobe completed the acquisition on April 28, 2026.

== Acquisitions ==
Acquisitions made by Semrush include:

- 2022 – Backlinko, a digital marketing and SEO educational website
- 2022 – Kompyte, an intelligence and sales platform
- 2023 – Traffic Think Tank, a SEO community
- 2024 – Third Door Media, publisher of Search Engine Land
- 2024 – Brand24, a brand monitoring platform
- 2024 – Ryte, for SEO and user experience
- 2024 – Datos, for data analytics
- 2024 – Exploding Topics, a data-driven trend discovery platform

== Products ==
The platform provides tools for search engine optimization (SEO), AI search visibility, competitive analysis, content marketing, performance-based advertising, local SEO, website auditing, reporting, and system integration. The platform also includes AI search visibility tools that monitor how brands appear in AI-generated responses on large language model (LLM) platforms such as ChatGPT or Google Gemini.

The keyword research tool provides various data points on each keyword. The platform also collects information about online keywords gathered from Google and Bing search engines.

Name	Type
Semrush	Digital marketing software platform
Semrush One	SEO and AI search visibility platform
Semrush for Enterprise	Enterprise marketing software suite that includes Enterprise SEO, Enterprise AIO (AI Optimization), and Enterprise SI (Site Intelligence)
Enterprise SEO	Enterprise SEO platform
Enterprise AIO	AI search optimization platform
Enterprise SI	Website intelligence platform

== Third Door Media ==
Semrush acquired Third Door Media, the owner of publications Search Engine Land and MarTech, in October 2024.

Search Engine Land is a news website that covers search engine marketing and search engine optimization. Search Engine Land stories are often cited by other mainstream media and industry publications. It was founded by Danny Sullivan and Chris Sherman in 2006.
