= Search Engine Strategies =

Search Engine Strategies Logo

Search Engine Strategies (SES) is a conference series focused on search engine marketing and search engine optimization.

== History ==
The conference was created by Danny Sullivan, founder and former lead editor of Search Engine Watch. The first SES conference was on November 18, 1999, in San Francisco, California and marked the first formal occasion that site owners had met with search engines.

The conference expanded internationally in 2000 when the first SES UK was held in London, England on April 27, 2000, followed by Denmark in 2001, Germany in 2002, and France, Sweden, Canada, Italy and China until 2006. The growth of the industry caused the creation of special niche SES Conferences such as SES Multimedia & Mobile Edition and SES Latino. Where SES Latino 2006 and 2007 was moderated by conference chair Nacho Hernandez.

Incisive Media purchased Search Engine Watch from MecklerMedia (now Jupitermedia) for $43 million in 2005 that year.

Just over a year after the purchase, Sullivan announced his resignation from guiding the series on August 29, 2006 after a contract dispute but later agreed to run two further shows in the US and speak at a third during 2007.

In 2015, Incisive Media sold SES, Search Engine Watch, and ClickZ to Blenheim Chalcot.

== "Google Dance" ==
One of the highlights of the Search Engine Strategies San Jose event, is the party at Google headquarters in Mountain View, CA (Googleplex), dubbed "Google Dance".

== See also ==
- Search engine optimization
- Social media optimization
- Search engine marketing
- Internet marketing
- SAScon (UK search conference)
