= Intent marketing =

Marketing based on consumers' intent to use that particular service

Intent marketing is about marketing a product or a service based on consumers' intent to adopt, purchase or consume that particular service which the subscriber may have explicitly or implicitly conveyed.

Marketing to consumers' intent is expected to produce better ROI because of the absence of the need to create awareness about a product or service in the consumer's mind before promoting it. Consumer's intent for consuming a product or service may either be predicted based on behavioral data or captured explicitly when the subscriber tries to purchase a product and the transaction has been aborted for some reason.

== Intent Data Sources ==
Most marketers are familiar with Search Marketing (both Search engine marketing and search engine optimization) as an intent data source, but there are other important sources, including:

- site data
- off-site web activity
- point-of-sale, CRM
- social data
- content consumption data.

In essence, intent data is the digital footprints left behind when a user uses a particular keyword on a search engine, visit a website, downloads a whitepaper, engages with your website, interacts on social platforms and so on. Each of these interactions gives us an individual's current and future intention, giving us a better picture of the individual and the account.

Individually these signals tell us a lot. When grouped and linked to individual people, we can uncover new ways to engage with those people while extrapolating engagement patterns to better interact with similar audiences.

== Telecom operator’s scenario ==
In prepaid majority telecom markets, mobile subscribers try to purchase or subscribe to various services using their mobile handsets as the medium and use their prepaid balance to pay for it. In some cases, the transaction initiated by the mobile subscriber to purchase or subscribe for a service may fail because of the absence of enough prepaid balance required for it. In such cases, mobile operators may capture the failed transaction due to lack of prepaid balance (or any other reason), as subscriber's intent to purchase a product or subscribe for service and market it when the subscriber has enough prepaid balance. In this case, the mobile telecom subscriber's intention is taken explicitly from the failed transactions and used to market the product or service when the timing is right.

== See also ==
- User intent – A user's goal in making a search query
- Digital marketing – Marketing of products or services using digital technologies or digital tools
- Search engine optimization – Practice of increasing online visibility
- CRM – Process of managing interactions with customers
