= Manchester Metropolitan University Business School =

- Type: Public
- Established: 1889
- Vice-Chancellor: Malcolm Press
- Dean: Hannah Holmes (Business School)
- Location: Lower Ormond Street; Manchester; M15 6BX, United Kingdom; 53.4704°N 2.2407°W
- Campus: All Saints Campus
- Website: www.mmu.ac.uk/business-school/

Manchester Metropolitan University Business School is a business school of Manchester Metropolitan University. It traces its roots as a provider of business education back to 1889.

Over 9,000 students are enrolled across the Business School’s undergraduate, postgraduate and research degrees. A further 2,000 students are enrolled in degree apprenticeship programmes.

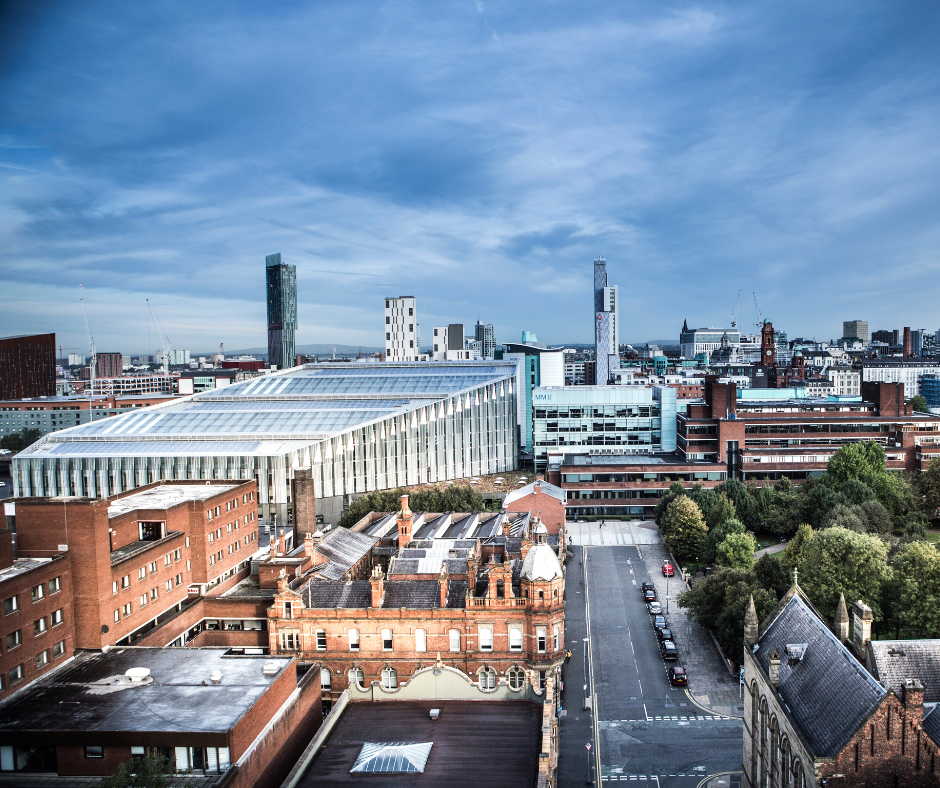
Manchester Metropolitan University Business School and the All Saints campus

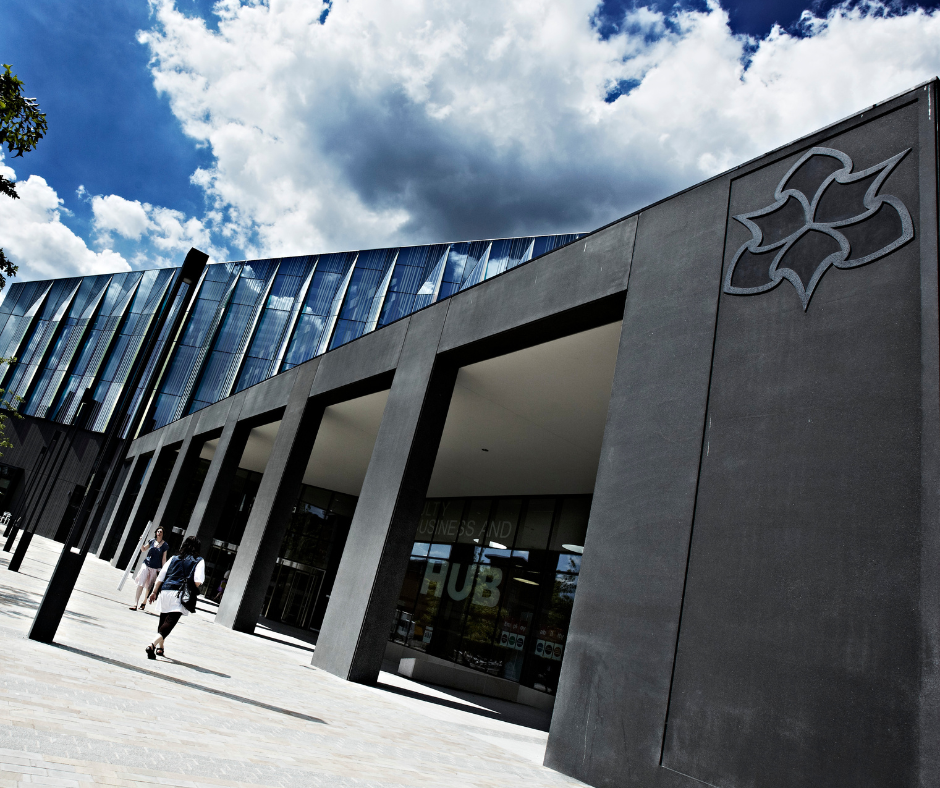
Manchester Metropolitan University Business School front entrance

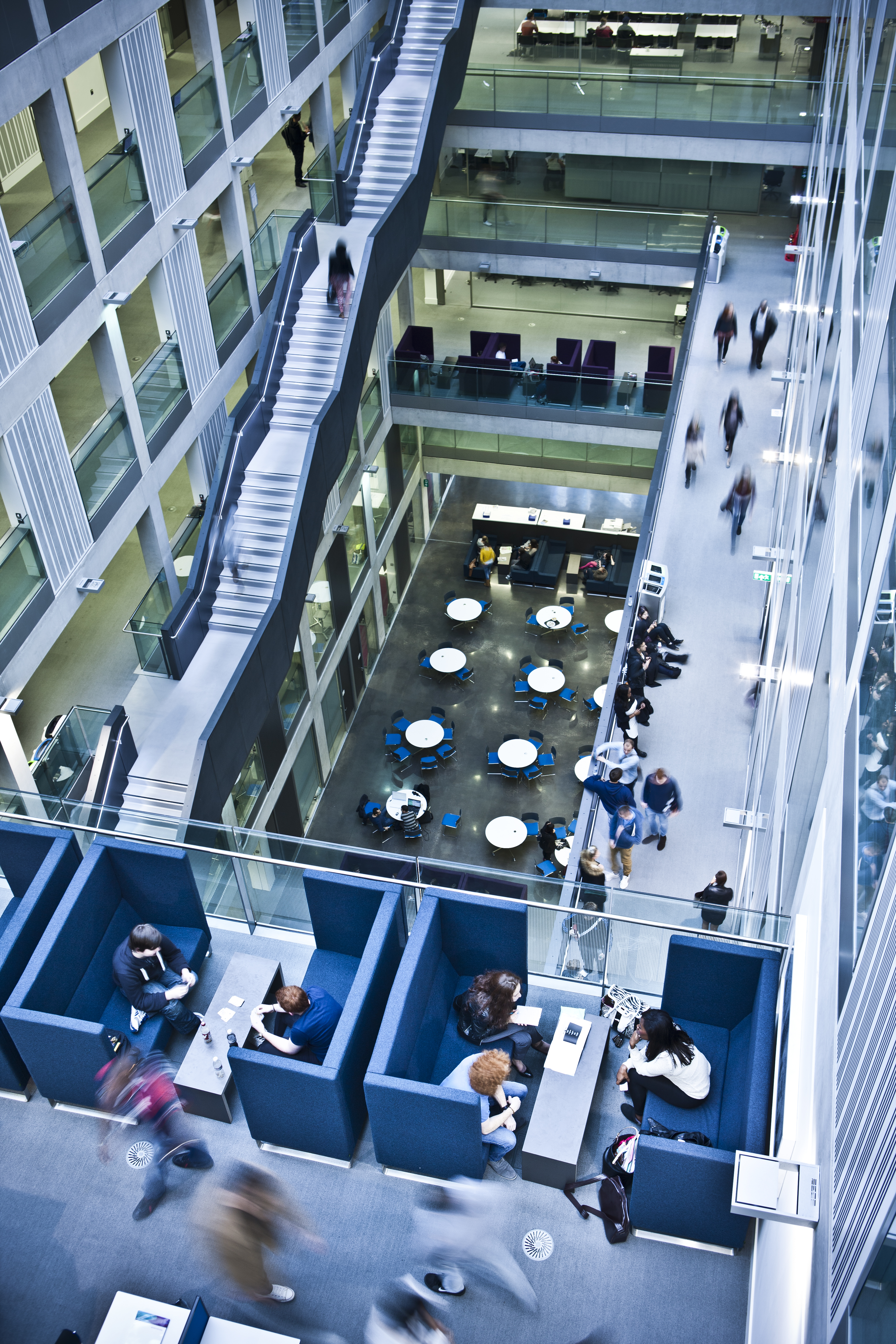
Inside the Manchester Metropolitan University Business School

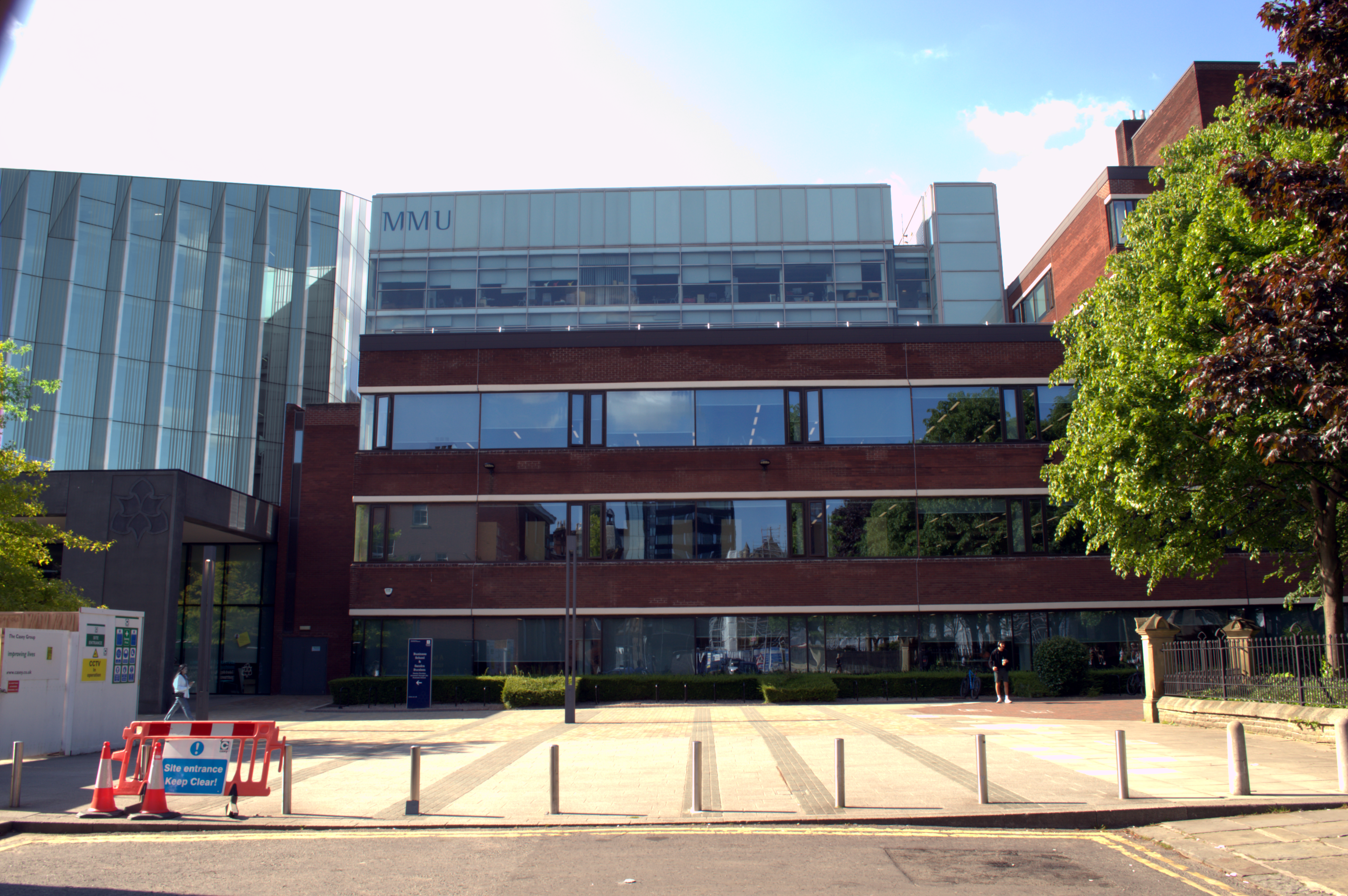
View from Bellhouse.

== Academic divisions ==
- Finance and Economics
- Marketing, International Business and Tourism
- Operations, Technology, Events and Hospitality Management
- People and Performance
- Strategy, Enterprise and Sustainability

== Research ==
Research at the Manchester Metropolitan University Business School is conducted across three University Centres for Research and Knowledge Exchange (UCRKEs).

== Alumni ==
- Paul S. Walsh, CEO of Diageo
- Dianne Thompson, CEO of Camelot Group
- Jonathan Mildenhall, Marketing director of Coca-Cola
- Michael Turner, former CEO of BAE Systems
- Gordon Taylor, CEO of Professional Footballers Association

== Other usage ==
The Manchester Metropolitan University Business School Business School premises are also used for conferences and events such as SAScon and the Chartered Institute of Personnel and Development Manchester conference.
