= Danny Sullivan (technologist) =

American technologist and journalist

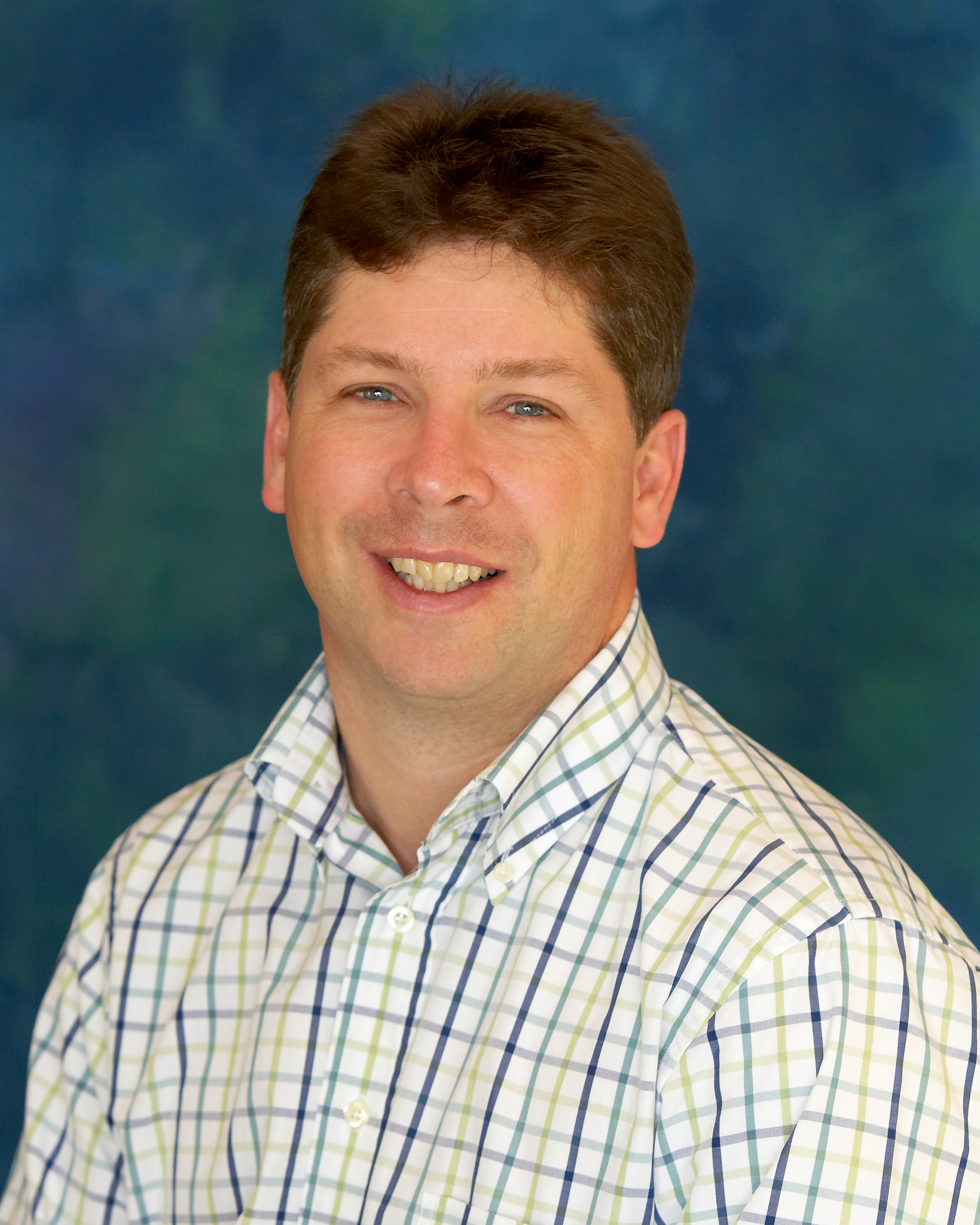
- Danny Sullivan in 2005
- Born: 26 September 1965 (age 61); Newport Beach, California, U.S.
- Education: University of California, Irvine
- Occupations: Technologist, Journalist
- Known for: Founder of Search Engine Land and Maximized Online
- Spouse: Lorna Harris (m. ?)
- Children: 2

Danny Sullivan is an American technologist, journalist, and entrepreneur. He is the founder of Search Engine Watch in 1997, one of the earliest online publications about search engine marketing. He also launched Search Engine Strategies, one of the earliest search marketing trade shows. After selling both companies in 2006, he co-founded Search Engine Land, another search marketing publication. In 2017, he joined Google as an adviser at the search division of the company.

He has been credited with popularizing the term "search engine marketing" and has been described as the father of the search engine marketing industry.

== Biography ==
Sullivan was born in 1965 and raised in California. He graduated from the University of California, Irvine, and was a reporter for the Los Angeles Times and the Orange County Register. He helped found Maximized Online with programmer Ken Spreitzer. He later married Lorna Harris and lived for several years in Chitterne, a small village in England. They have two sons. The family moved to Newport Beach, California. Sullivan popularized the term Search Engine Marketing in an article on Search Engine Watch although he does not take credit for coining the term.

Sullivan was the chief content officer at Third Door Media, and co-founded Search Engine Land, an industry publication that covers news and information about search engines, search marketing, SEO and SEM topics. Third Door Media also produces Marketing Land, a sister website that covers broader digital marketing topics including social media, display advertising, email marketing, analytics, mobile, and marketing technology. Search Engine Land and Marketing Land are owned by Third Door Media, of which Danny Sullivan was partner and chief content officer. He retired from his position as chief content officer at Third Door Media in June 2017.

In October 2017, Sullivan announced that he would be joining Google as an adviser at its search division. He is Google's Public Liaison for Search, who helps people better understand search and helps Google better hear public feedback.

== Affiliated websites ==
=== Search Engine Watch ===
Sullivan started Search Engine Watch in June 1997 after he posted research about search engines, called A Webmaster's Guide To Search Engines, in April 1996. Search Engine Watch was a website with tips on how to get good search engine results. Shortly after beginning in November that year, he sold it for an undisclosed amount to MecklerMedia (now Jupitermedia). He stayed on to maintain the site, and be the editor-in-chief. In 2006, it was sold to Incisive Media for $43 million. Search Engine Watch was considered by Matt Cutts of Google as "must reading", and Tim Mayer of Yahoo! as the "most authoritative source on search".

He also organized the Search Engine Strategies conference six times a year, attracting 1,500 to 6,000 attendees at each event. On 29 August 2006, Sullivan announced he would be leaving Search Engine Watch on 30 November 2006. He later came to an agreement with Jupitermedia to continue participating in SES through 2007.

=== Search Engine Land ===
In 2006 Sullivan founded Search Engine Land with Chris Sherman. Search Engine Land is a news website that covers search engine marketing and search engine optimization. It shares information about keyword research, trends in search marketing (SEM), paid search advertising (PPC) and search engine optimization (SEO) as well as analysis, advice, tips, tactics and how-to guides for search marketing. Search Engine Land stories have been cited numerous times by other media outlets.

Search Engine Land and other Third Door Media brands were acquired by Semrush in October, 2024.
