= Online search =

Locating information online

Online search is the process of interactively searching for and retrieving requested information via a computer from databases that are online. Interactive searches became possible in the 1980s with the advent of faster databases and smart terminals. In contrast, computerized batch searching was prevalent in the 1960s and 1970s. Today, searches through web search engines constitute the majority of online searches.

== Boolean searches ==
Most search engines offer advanced search options using Boolean expressions (also known as Boolean operations). These expressions allow searches to produce more precise and meaningful results. Based on Boolean algebra, these types of searches utilize logical operations using binary or dyadic processes. These include AND ($\land$) and OR ($\lor$) and the unary operator NOT ($\neg$).

The AND and NOT expressions are known as implied Boolean operators as they require or disallow a word or a phrase. The use of + symbol as a prefix before a keyword requires that word be in a search result. When using multiple Keywords this serves as an AND function requiring that all words with a + sign be in a search result. The use of - symbol as a prefix before a keyword eliminates that word from search results. This is the NOT Boolean operation which is sometimes called a negative search. Searches can not be entirely negative, and must include at least one positive keyword.

Some search engines, such as google, utilize systems with an implied AND operation. This means that the search engine will automatically apply the AND function inbetween keywords without having to enter a symbol for the AND operation. Other search engines may require that either the symbol & or + be added as a prefix before the keyword. These search engines use the "OR" Boolean expression as a default search setting. Those search engines with a default "AND" expression can still do an "OR" search by using the | symbol inbetween keywords.
