= Keyword research =

Practice in search engine optimization

Keyword research is a practice search engine optimization (SEO) professionals use to find and analyze search terms that users enter into search engines when looking for products, services, or general information. Keywords are related to search queries.

== Importance of research ==
=== Keyword research ===
The objective of keyword research is to generate, with good precision and recall, a large number of terms that are highly relevant yet non-obvious to the given input keyword. The process of keyword research involves brainstorming and the use of keyword research tools, with popular ones including Semrush and Google Trends. To achieve the best SEO results, it is important to optimize a website's content as well as backlinks for the most relevant keywords. It is good practice to search for related keywords that have low competition and still a high number of searches. This makes it easier to achieve a higher rank in search engines which usually results in higher web traffic and, ideally, conversions. The downside of this practice is that the website is optimized for alternative keywords instead of the main keyword; main keywords might be very difficult to rank due to high competition. There are three essential concepts to consider when conducting keyword research. Good keywords are closely related to the subject of the website. Most search engines use an internal quality system to check website relevance related to possible keywords, a non-relevant keyword is unlikely to rank well for a website. Good keywords that are highly competitive are less likely to rank at the top. Keywords that have no monthly searches are believed to generate little to no traffic and therefore of little value for SEO. Keyword stuffing on a web page should be avoided.

=== Types of keywords ===
Keywords are divided into two primary groups based on search volume.

- Short-tail keywords – most commonly searched keywords and the conversion rate is between 15 and 20%. They do not contain any specific details and have fewer word counts (1–2 words). They get high search traffic but have a lower conversion rate. For example: "Buy shoes" is a short-tail keyword.
- Long-tail keywords — conversion rate is between 70 and 80%. They contain more specific details and have longer word counts (2–5 words). They get less search traffic but have a higher conversion rate. For example: "Buy breathable running shoes" is a long-tail keyword.

=== Search intent ===
Search intent, or user intent, represents the purpose behind a user's search query. Search engines do target the data about user intent to show more targeted and precise results. The need behind a query can be: informational (learning), navigational (finding a site), commercial (comparing options), and transactional (ready to purchase).

=== Research examples ===
A very popular and highly competitive keyword on Google search engine is "making money." It has 4,860,000,000 search results, meaning that billions of websites are relevant or competing for that keyword. Keyword research starts with finding all possible word combinations that are relevant to the "making money" keyword. For example, the keyword "acquiring money" has significantly fewer search results, only 116,000,000, but it has the same meaning as "making money." Another way is to be more specific about a keyword by adding additional filters. For example, the keyword "making money online from home in Canada" is less competitive on a global scale and therefore easier to rank for. Furthermore, keywords also have various intents (informational, navigational, commercial, and transactional) which can affect whether the marketer would want to target that keyword. Multiple tools are available (both free and commercial) to find keywords and analyze them.

== Keyword research tools ==
=== Google Ads Keyword Planner ===
Google offers free tools to do some basic keyword analysis. All the results are based on data from the Google search engine.

In 2016, Google released an update to the Google Keyword Planner and changed some of its policies by which the first campaign must be set to get the Keyword Planner back. This is a type of Google Ads account that is used by agencies and consultants to manage many different advertising accounts.

Features of Google Ads Keyword Planner:

- Get search volume estimates for the keyword.
- Generate new keywords by combining different keyword lists.
- Create new keyword variations based on the primary keyword.
- Provide keywords used for websites – useful for competitive analysis.

Limitations of Google Ads Keyword Planner:

- Hides long tail keywords' data as the tool is made for Google Ads and not for SEO purposes.
- Keywords generated by the tool may not produce good results as the tool is targeted towards advertisers and not SEO.
- The search volume displayed received a change in 2016, Google started limiting the output options to advertisers (or accounts) with lower or no monthly spending.
- The tool is challenging to use on mobile devices, as it is primarily optimized for desktop usage.

=== Google Trends ===
Google Trends is a free research tool provided by Google to see the trends of any particular keyword. It particularly helps to visualize and compare the data from Google searches. The tool uses graphs to showcase the trend of data over time derived from Google Search queries. It allows users to compare multiple keyword trends to find out which keywords are more popular than others in particular regions at a particular time.

=== Google Suggest ===
Google introduced Google Suggest in 2004 as the new Labs project. Google Suggest is typically used as a live feature while a user is typing a search phrase into the browser or Google website. Google Suggest uses the organic search input of billions of users and tries to "guess" that way what a user might be searching for even before they finish entering the query or all the words of a keyword phrase.

This makes Google Suggest a relevant source for keyword research, as it contains numerous organic keywords very closely related to a full or partial keyword and can be used to find additional most searched appending keywords that make the whole keyword less competitive. Google Suggest can be researched through the Google Search website or through a compatible browser for a small number of keywords, but also on a large scale using free scraper tools.

=== Bing Ads Keyword Planner ===
The Bing Ads Keyword Planner provides keyword and ad group suggestions and shows average monthly search volume trends, relative competition and suggested bids. Features of Bing Keyword Planner:

- Get search volume data and trends.
- Get performance and cost estimates.
- Multiply keyword lists to get new keywords.

Limitations of Bing Ads Keyword Planner:

- Bing holds only 20 percent of the U.S. search engine market share, the data provided may not be reliable at least not for optimizing websites for Google search engine.
- Similar to Google Ads Keyword Planner, data furnished by the tool is for helping advertisers and not publishers.

== See also ==
- User intent
- List of search engines
- Search engine marketing
- Search engine results page
