= Search engine results page =

Display of results from a search

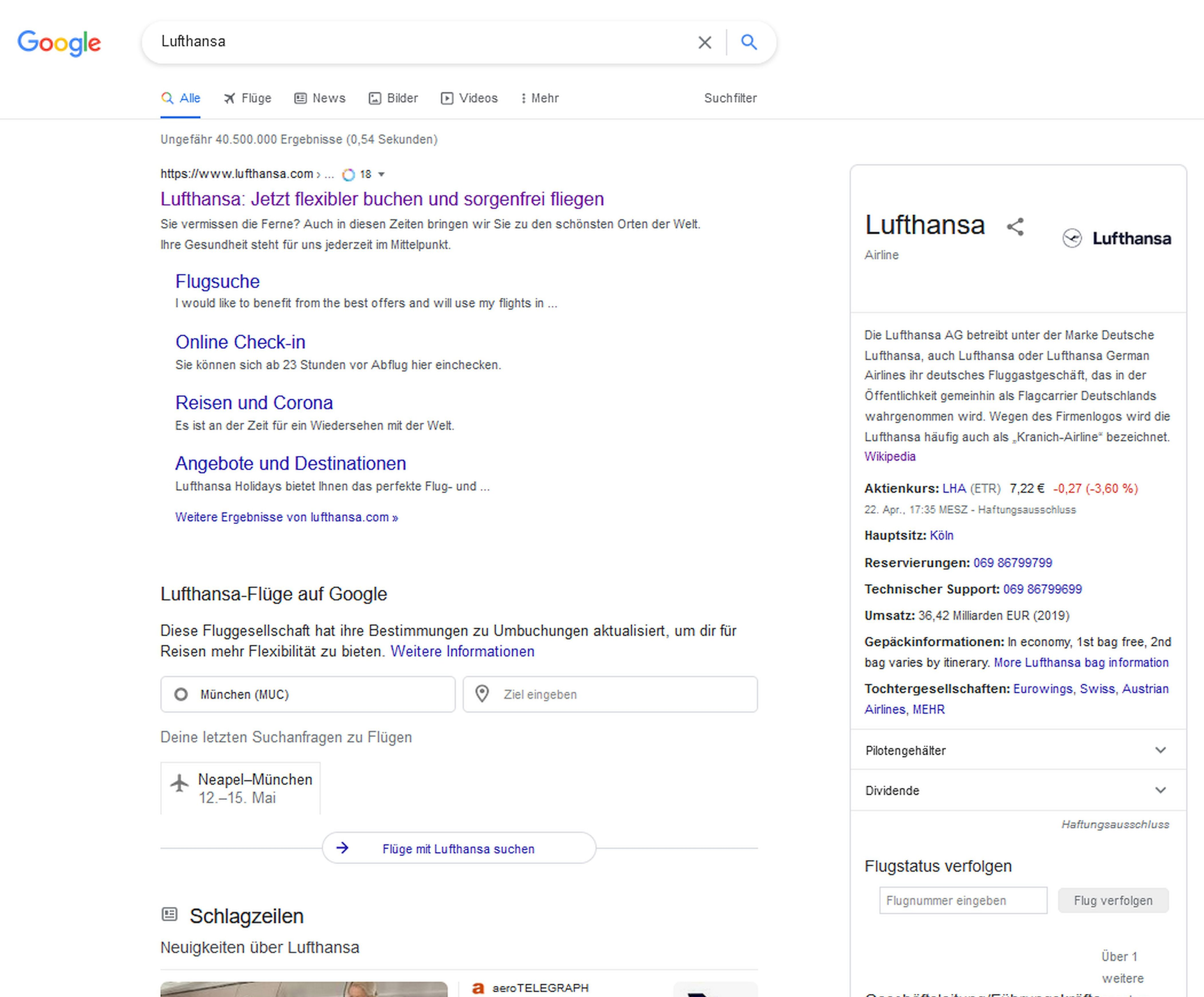
A Google Search results page in German from 2022

A search engine results page (SERP) is a web page that is displayed by a search engine in response to a query by a user. The main component of a SERP is the listing of results that are returned by the search engine in response to a keyword query.

The results are of two general types:

- organic search: retrieved by the search engine's algorithm;
- sponsored search: advertisements.

The results are normally ranked by relevance to the query. Each result displayed on the SERP normally includes a title, a link that points to the actual page on the Web, and a short description, known as a snippet, showing where the keywords have matched content within the page for organic results. For sponsored results, the advertiser chooses what to display.

A single search query can yield many pages of results. However, in order to avoid overwhelming users, search engines and personal preferences often limit the number of results displayed per page. As a result, subsequent pages may not be as relevant or ranked as highly as the first. Just like the world of traditional print media and its advertising, this enables competitive pricing for page real estate but is complicated by the dynamics of consumer expectations and intent— unlike static print media where the content and the advertising on every page are the same all of the time for all viewers, despite such hard copy being localized to some degree, usually geographic, like state, metro-area, city, or neighbourhood, search engine results can vary based on individual factors such as browsing habits.

== Components ==
The organic search results, queries, and advertisements are the three main components of the SERP, However, the SERP of major search engines, like Google, Yahoo!, Bing and Sogou may include many different types of enhanced results (organic search, and sponsored) such as rich snippets, images, maps, definitions, answer boxes, videos or suggested search refinements. A 2026 study of six major search engines identified 143 distinct SERP elements, classifying them into organic results, sponsored results, and other search features. In September 2015, the SEO software company Moz reported that in its MozCast data set of about 10,000 keywords tracked daily, 97% showed at least one rich or paid feature, and only 3% of those results pages were plain organic results. Another study on the evolution of SERPs interfaces from 2000 to 2020 shows that SERP are becoming more diverse in terms of elements, aggregating content from different verticals and including more features that provide direct answers. More recently, large language models (LLMs) like ChatGPT, Claude, and Gemini have introduced AI-powered answer boxes or generative overviews into SERPs, summarizing information from multiple sources directly on the results page and reducing clicks to external sites.

=== Search query ===
Also known as 'user search string', this is the word or set of words that are typed by the user in the search bar of the search engine. The search box is located on all major search engines like Google, Yahoo, Bing and Sogou. Users indicate the topic desired based on the keywords they enter into the search box in the search engine.

=== Organic results ===
Organic SERP listings are the natural listings generated by search engines, that display webpages matching the query. The pages are sorted on a relevance score based on a series of metrics generally based upon factors such as quality and relevance of the content, expertise, authoritativeness, trustworthiness of the website and author on a given topic, good user experience, and backlinks.

Each of the matching web pages is presented as a visual element composed of attribution, a title link, and a snippet of the matching webpage showing how the query matched on the page.

Search results pages typically contain numerous organic results, and users tend to view only the first results on the first page.

Search results may vary based on geographic location and may be simulated using manual URL parameters. which can be influenced by factors such as IP address, user settings, and localization parameters,

=== Sponsored results ===
Several major search engines offer "sponsored results" to companies, who may pay the search engine to have their products or services appear above other search hits. This is often done in the form of bidding between companies, where the highest bidder gets the top result. A 2018 report from the European Commission showed that consumers generally avoid these top results, as there is an expectation that the topmost results on a search engine page will be sponsored, and thus less relevant.

=== Rich snippets ===
Rich snippets are displayed by Google in the search results pages when a website contains content in structured data markup. Structured data markup helps the Google algorithm to index and understand the content better. Google supports rich snippets for various data types, including products, recipes, reviews, events, news articles, and job postings.

=== Featured snippets ===
A featured snippet is a summary of an answer to a user's query. This snippet appears at the top of the list of search hits. Google supports the following types of featured snippets: Paragraph Featured Snippet, Numbered List Featured Snippet, Bulleted List Featured Snippet, Table Featured Snippet, YouTube Featured Snippet, Carousel Snippet, Double Featured Snippet, and Two-for-One Featured Snippet.

=== Knowledge graph ===
Search engines like Google, Bing, Sogou have started to expand their data into encyclopedia sources and other more structured troves of information. How these entries are displayed, and with what degree of preview detail, varies substantially between these search engine UX implementations.

=== Google Discover ===
Google Discover formerly known as Google Feed is a way of getting topics and news information to users on the homepage below the search box.

== Generation ==
Major search engines like Google, Yahoo!, Bing, Sogou primarily use content contained within the page and fallback to metadata tags of a web page to generate the content that makes up a search snippet. Generally, the HTML title tag will be used as the title of the snippet while the most relevant or useful contents of the web page (description tag or page copy) will be used for the description.

== Scraping and automated access ==
Search engine result pages are protected from automated access by a range of defensive mechanisms and terms of service. These result pages are the primary data source for Search engine optimization, the website placement for competitive keywords that has become an important field of business and interest.

The process of harvesting search engine result pages data is usually called "search engine scraping" or in a general form "web crawling" and generates the data SEO-related companies need to evaluate website competitive organic and sponsored rankings. This data can be used to track the position of websites and show the effectiveness of SEO as well as keywords that may need more SEO investment to rank higher.

== See also ==
- User intent – A user's goal in making a search query
- Search engine optimization – Practice and strategies of increasing online visibility
- List of Search Engines
- Generative engine optimization – Digital marketing technique
