= User intent =

A user's goal in making a search query

User intent, also known as query intent or search intent, is the identification and categorization of what a user online intended or wanted to find when they typed their search terms into an online web search engine for the purpose of search engine optimisation or conversion rate optimisation. Examples of user intent are fact-checking, comparison shopping or navigating to other websites.

== Optimizing For User Intent ==
To increase ranking on search engines, marketers need to create content that best satisfies queries entered by users on their smartphones or desktops. Creating content with user intent in mind helps increase the value of the information being showcased. Keyword research can help determine user intent. The search terms a user enters into a web search engine to find content, services, or products are the words that should be used on the webpage to optimize for user intent.

Google can show SERP features such as featured snippets, knowledge cards or knowledge panels for queries where the search intent is clear. SEO practitioners take this into account because Google can often satisfy the user intent without having the user leave Google SERP. The better Google gets in figuring out user intent, the less users are going to click on search results. As of 2019, less than half of Google searches result in clicks.

== Types ==
Though there are various ways of classifying the categories of user intent, overall, they tend to follow the same clusters. Until 2017, there were three broad categories: informational, transactional, and navigational. However, after the rise of mobile search, other categories have appeared or have segmented into more specific categorisation. For example, as mobile users may want to find directions or information about a specific physical location, some marketers have proposed categories such as "local intent," as in searches like "XY near me." Additionally, there is commercial search intent, which is when someone searches for a product or service to know more about it or compare other alternatives before finalizing their purchase.

Some notable types with examples below include:

Informational Intent: Donald Trump, Who is Maradona?, How to lose weight?

Navigational Intent: Facebook login, Wikipedia contribution page

Transactional Intent: Latest iPhone, Amazon coupons, cheap dell laptop, fence installers

Commercial Intent: top headphones, best marketing agency, x protein powder review,

Local Search Intent: restaurants near me, nearest gas station,

Many search queries also have mixed search intent. For example, when someone searches "Best iPhone repair shop near me" is transactional and local search intent. Mixed search intent can easily happen with homonyms and such SERPs tend to be volatile because user signals differ.

User intent is often misinterpreted, and thinking that there are just a few user intent types is not giving the complete picture of the user behavior.

It is also a term to describe what type of activity, business or services users are searching for (not only the user behavior after the search).

Example: when you write 'Spanish games' in the search engine (your browser settings in English) you have results for learning Spanish methods, not a real games with Spanish origin. In this example, the user intent is to learn Spanish language, not to play typical games. This intent is reflected by Google and the other search engines, and they strive to display their SERP results based on the user interest.

== See also ==
- Keyword research – Practice in search engine optimization
- Intent marketing – Marketing based on consumers' intent to use that particular service
- Search engine results page – Display of results from a search
- Principle of least astonishment – Principle in computer system design
- Mobile marketing – Multi-channel online marketing technique
- Generative engine optimization – Digital marketing technique
