= Search engine marketing =

Form of internet marketing

Search engine marketing (SEM) is a form of Internet marketing that involves the promotion of websites by increasing their visibility in search engine results pages (SERPs) primarily through paid advertising. SEM may incorporate search engine optimization (SEO), which adjusts or rewrites website content and site architecture to achieve a higher ranking in search engine results pages, enhance pay-per-click (PPC) listings, and increase the call to action (CTA) on the website.

== Market ==
In 2007, U.S. advertisers spent US $24.6 billion on search engine marketing. In Q2 2015, Google (73.7%) and the Yahoo/Bing (26.3%) partnership accounted for almost 100% of U.S. search engine spend. As of 2006, SEM was growing much faster than traditional advertising and even other channels of online marketing. Managing search campaigns is either done directly with the SEM vendor or through an SEM tool provider. It may also be self-serve or through an advertising agency.

Search engine marketing is also a method of business analytics, which is mainly aimed at providing useful information for organizations to find business opportunities and generate profits. SEM can help organizations optimize their marketing and gather more audience and create more customers.

=== Google's market dominance ===
As of May 2026, Google remained the leading search engine worldwide with a market share of 90.39%. Bing ranked second with a 5.03% share, followed by Yahoo! (1.40%), Yandex (0.99%), DuckDuckGo (0.71%), and Baidu (0.53%).

In August 2024, a U.S. federal court ruled that Google's search engine was operated as part of an unlawfully maintained monopoly in the general search services market. During the trial, the US Department of Justice argued "Google hasn't just illegally cornered the market in search — it's squeezed online publishers and advertisers with a "trifecta" of monopolies that have harmed virtually the entire World Wide Web".

In 2025, Google began integrating paid advertisements directly into its AI Overviews feature, which generates AI-produced summaries at the top of search results pages. At Google Marketing Live in May 2025, the company announced that Search and Shopping ads within AI Overviews would roll out to desktop users in the United States, with global expansion planned later in the year. Research published in December 2025 found that ads alongside AI Overviews had grown from appearing on approximately 3% of AI Overview search results pages in January 2025 to roughly 40% by November 2025.

== History ==
As the number of sites on the Web increased in the mid-to-late 1990s, search engines started appearing to help people find information quickly. Search engines developed business models to finance their services, such as pay per click programs offered by Open Text in 1996 and then Goto.com in 1998. Goto.com later changed its name to Overture in 2001, was purchased by Yahoo! in 2003, and now offers paid search opportunities for advertisers through Yahoo! Search Marketing. Google also began to offer advertisements on search results pages in 2000 through the Google AdWords program. By 2007, pay-per-click programs proved to be primary moneymakers for search engines. In a market dominated by Google, in 2009 Yahoo! and Microsoft announced the intention to forge an alliance. The Yahoo! & Microsoft Search Alliance eventually received approval from regulators in the US and Europe in February 2010.

Search engine optimization consultants expanded their offerings to help businesses learn about and use the advertising opportunities offered by search engines, and new agencies focusing primarily upon marketing and advertising through search engines emerged. The term "search engine marketing" was popularized by Danny Sullivan in 2001 to cover the spectrum of activities involved in performing SEO, managing paid listings at the search engines, submitting sites to directories, and developing online marketing strategies for businesses, organizations, and individuals.

== Methods and metrics ==
Search engine marketing uses at least five methods and metrics to optimize websites.

1. Keyword research and analysis involve three "steps": ensuring the site can be indexed in the search engines, finding the most relevant and popular keywords for the site and its products, and using those keywords on the site in a way that will generate and convert traffic. A follow-on effect of keyword analysis and research is the search perception impact. Search perception impact describes the identified impact of a brand's search results on consumer perception, including title and meta tags, site indexing, and keyword focus. As online searching is often the first step for potential consumers/customers, the search perception impact shapes the brand impression for each individual.
2. Website saturation and popularity, or how much presence a website has on search engines, can be analyzed through the number of pages of the site that are indexed by search engines (saturation) and how many backlinks the site has (popularity). It requires pages to contain keywords people are looking for and ensure that they rank high enough in search engine rankings. Most search engines include some form of link popularity in their ranking algorithms. The following are major tools measuring various aspects of saturation and link popularity: Link Popularity, Top 10 Google Analysis, and Marketleap's Link Popularity and Search Engine Saturation.
3. Back end tools, including Web analytic tools and HTML validators, provide data on a website and its visitors and allow the success of a website to be measured. They range from simple traffic counters to tools that work with log files and to more sophisticated tools that are based on page tagging (putting JavaScript or an image on a page to track actions). These tools can deliver conversion-related information. Validators check the invisible parts of websites, highlighting potential problems and many usability issues and ensuring websites meet W3C code standards. Try to use more than one HTML validator or spider simulator because each one tests, highlights, and reports on slightly different aspects of your website.
4. Whois tools reveal the owners of various websites and can provide valuable information relating to copyright and trademark issues.
5. Google Mobile-Friendly Website Checker: This test will analyze a URL and report if the page has a mobile-friendly design.

Search engine marketing is a way to create and edit a website so that search engines rank it higher than other pages. It should be also focused on keyword marketing or pay-per-click advertising (PPC). The technology enables advertisers to bid on specific keywords or phrases and ensures ads appear with the results of search engines.

With the development of this system, the price is growing under a high level of competition. Many advertisers prefer to expand their activities, including increasing search engines and adding more keywords. The more advertisers are willing to pay for clicks, the higher the ranking for advertising, which leads to higher traffic. PPC comes at a cost. The higher position is likely to cost $5 for a given keyword, and $4.50 for a third location. A third advertiser earns 10% less than the top advertiser while reducing traffic by 50%.

Investors must consider their return on investment when engaging in PPC campaigns. Buying traffic via PPC will deliver a positive ROI when the total cost-per-click for a single conversion remains below the profit margin. That way the amount of money spent to generate revenue is below the actual revenue generated.

There are many reasons explaining why advertisers choose the SEM strategy. First, creating a SEM account is easy and can build traffic quickly based on the degree of competition. The shopper who uses the search engine to find information tends to trust and focus on the links showed in the results pages. However, a large number of online sellers do not buy search engine optimization to obtain higher ranking lists of search results but prefer paid links. A growing number of online publishers are allowing search engines such as Google to crawl content on their pages and place relevant ads on it. From an online seller's point of view, this is an extension of the payment settlement and an additional incentive to invest in paid advertising projects. Therefore, it is virtually impossible for advertisers with limited budgets to maintain the highest rankings in the increasingly competitive search market.

Google's search engine marketing is one of the western world's marketing leaders, while its search engine marketing is its biggest source of profit. Google's search engine providers are clearly ahead of the Yahoo and Bing network. The display of unknown search results is free, while advertisers are willing to pay for each click of the ad in the sponsored search results.

== Paid inclusion ==
Paid inclusion involves a search engine company charging fees for the inclusion of a website in their results pages. Also known as sponsored listings, paid inclusion products are provided by most search engine companies either in the main results area or as a separately identified advertising area.

The fee structure is both a filter against superfluous submissions and a revenue generator. Typically, the fee covers an annual subscription for one webpage, which will automatically be catalogued on a regular basis. However, some companies are experimenting with non-subscription based fee structures where purchased listings are displayed permanently. A per-click fee may also apply. Each search engine is different. Some sites allow only paid inclusion, although these have had little success. More frequently, many search engines, like Yahoo!, mix paid inclusion (per-page and per-click fee) with results from web crawling. Others, like Google (and as of 2006, Ask.com), do not let webmasters pay to be in their search engine listing (advertisements are shown separately and labeled as such).

Some detractors of paid inclusion allege that it causes searches to return results based more on the economic standing of the interests of a web site, and less on the relevancy of that site to end-users.

Often the line between pay per click advertising and paid inclusion is debatable. Some have lobbied for any paid listings to be labeled as an advertisement, while defenders insist they are not actually ads since the webmasters do not control the content of the listing, its ranking, or even whether it is shown to any users. Another advantage of paid inclusion is that it allows site owners to specify particular schedules for crawling pages. In the general case, one has no control as to when their page will be crawled or added to a search engine index. Paid inclusion proves to be particularly useful for cases where pages are dynamically generated and frequently modified.

Paid inclusion is a search engine marketing method in itself, but also a tool of search engine optimization since experts and firms can test out different approaches to improving ranking and see the results often within a couple of days, instead of waiting weeks or months. Knowledge gained this way can be used to optimize other web pages, without paying the search engine company.

== Comparison with SEO ==
SEM is the wider discipline that incorporates SEO. SEM includes both paid search results (using tools like Google AdWords or Bing Ads, formerly known as Microsoft adCenter) and organic search results (SEO). SEM uses paid advertising with AdWords or Bing Ads, pay per click (particularly beneficial for local providers as it enables potential consumers to contact a company directly with one click), article submissions, advertising and making sure SEO has been done. A keyword analysis is performed for both SEO and SEM, but not necessarily at the same time. SEM and SEO both need to be monitored and updated frequently to reflect evolving best practices.

In some contexts, the term SEM is used exclusively to mean pay per click advertising, particularly in the commercial advertising and marketing communities which have a vested interest in this narrow definition. Such usage excludes the wider search marketing community that is engaged in other forms of SEM such as search engine optimization and search retargeting.

Creating the link between SEO and PPC represents an integral part of the SEM concept. Sometimes, especially when separate teams work on SEO and PPC and the efforts are not synced, positive results of aligning their strategies can be lost. The aim of both SEO and PPC is maximizing the visibility in search and thus, their actions to achieve it should be centrally coordinated. Both teams can benefit from setting shared goals and combined metrics, evaluating data together to determine future strategy or discuss which of the tools works better to get the traffic for selected keywords in the national and local search results. Thanks to this, the search visibility can be increased along with optimizing both conversions and costs.

Another part of SEM is social media marketing (SMM). SMM is a type of marketing that involves exploiting social media to influence consumers that one company’s products and/or services are valuable. Some of the latest theoretical advances include search engine marketing management (SEMM). SEMM relates to activities including SEO but focuses on return on investment (ROI) management instead of relevant traffic building (as is the case of mainstream SEO). SEMM also integrates organic SEO, trying to achieve top ranking without using paid means to achieve it, and pay per click SEO. For example, some of the attention is placed on the web page layout design and how content and information is displayed to the website visitor. SEO & SEM are two pillars of one marketing job and they both run side by side to produce much better results than focusing on only one pillar.

== Ethical questions ==
Paid search advertising has not been without controversy and the issue of how search engines present advertising on their search result pages has been the target of a series of studies and reports by Consumer Reports WebWatch. The Federal Trade Commission (FTC) also issued a letter in 2002 about the importance of disclosure of paid advertising on search engines, in response to a complaint from Commercial Alert, a consumer advocacy group with ties to Ralph Nader.

Another ethical controversy associated with search marketing has been the issue of trademark infringement. The debate as to whether third parties should have the right to bid on their competitors' brand names has been underway for years. In 2009 Google changed their policy, which formerly prohibited these tactics, allowing 3rd parties to bid on branded terms as long as their landing page in fact provides information on the trademarked term. Though the policy has been changed this continues to be a source of heated debate.

On April 24, 2012, many started to see that Google has started to penalize companies that are buying links for the purpose of passing off the rank. The Google Update was called Penguin. Since then, there have been several different Penguin/Panda updates rolled out by Google. SEM has, however, nothing to do with link buying and focuses on organic SEO and PPC management. As of October 20, 2014, Google had released three official revisions of their Penguin Update.

In 2013, the Tenth Circuit Court of Appeals held in Lens.com, Inc. v. 1-800 Contacts, Inc. that online contact lens seller Lens.com did not commit trademark infringement when it purchased search advertisements using competitor 1-800 Contacts' federally registered 1800 CONTACTS trademark as a keyword. In August 2016, the Federal Trade Commission filed an administrative complaint against 1-800 Contacts alleging, among other things, that its trademark enforcement practices in the search engine marketing space have unreasonably restrained competition in violation of the FTC Act. 1-800 Contacts has denied all wrongdoing and appeared before an FTC administrative law judge in April 2017.

== Examples ==
Google Ads is recognized as a web-based advertising utensil since it adopts keywords that can deliver adverts explicitly to web users looking for information in respect to a certain product or service. It is flexible and provides customizable options like Ad Extensions, access to non-search sites, leveraging the display network to help increase brand awareness. The project hinges on cost per click (CPC) pricing where the maximum cost per day for the campaign can be chosen, thus the payment of the service only applies if the advert has been clicked. SEM companies have embarked on Google Ads projects as a way to publicize their SEM and SEO services. One of the most successful approaches to the strategy of this project was to focus on making sure that PPC advertising funds were prudently invested. Moreover, SEM companies have described Google Ads as a practical tool for increasing a consumer’s investment earnings on Internet advertising. The use of conversion tracking and Google Analytics tools was deemed to be practical for presenting to clients the performance of their canvas from click to conversion. Google Ads project has enabled SEM companies to train their clients on the utensil and delivers better performance to the canvass. The assistance of Google Ads canvass could contribute to the growth of web traffic for a number of its consumer’s websites, by as much as 250% in only nine months.

Another way search engine marketing is managed is by contextual advertising. Here marketers place ads on other sites or portals that carry information relevant to their products so that the ads jump into the circle of vision of browsers who are seeking information from those sites. A successful SEM plan is the approach to capture the relationships amongst information searchers, businesses, and search engines. Search engines were not important to some industries in the past, but over the past years the use of search engines for accessing information has become vital to increase business opportunities. The use of SEM strategic tools for businesses such as tourism can attract potential consumers to view their products, but it could also pose various challenges. These challenges could be the competition that companies face amongst their industry and other sources of information that could draw the attention of online consumers. To assist the combat of challenges, the main objective for businesses applying SEM is to improve and maintain their ranking as high as possible on SERPs so that they can gain visibility. Therefore, search engines are adjusting and developing algorithms and the shifting criteria by which web pages are ranked sequentially to combat against search engine misuse and spamming, and to supply the most relevant information to searchers. This could enhance the relationship amongst information searchers, businesses, and search engines by understanding the strategies of marketing to attract business.

== See also ==
- Generative engine optimization
- Dynamic keyword insertion
- Search engine manipulation effect
- Search engine reputation management
- Web marketing
- User intent
- Search engine privacy
- Mobile marketing
