= Salsa =

Salsa most often refers to:

- Salsa (food), a variety of sauces used as condiments
- Salsa music, a popular style of Latin American music
- Salsa (dance), a Latin dance associated with Salsa music

Salsa or SALSA may also refer to:

== Arts and entertainment ==
- Salsa (film), a 1988 American romance film
- Salsa, a TV series program on Georgia Public Broadcasting
- Salsa, a 2000 album by Celia Cruz
- Salsa (EP), by Residual Kid, 2016
- Salsa, a character in the video game Mother 3
- Salsa, a character in the video game Eternal Sonata

== Transportation ==
- Salsa d'Haïti, a Haitian regional airline
- SEAT Salsa, a concept car
- Salsa, a satellite in the Cluster II mission
- Salsa Cycles, an American bicycle brand

== Other uses ==
- La Salsa, an American casual dining restaurant chain
- Salsa's Fresh Mex Grill, an Australian chain of fast-food restaurants
- Salsa family of stream ciphers, particularly Salsa20
- SALSA (food standard), a British food standard
- Salsa (spider), a genus of spiders in the family Araneidae
- SALSA algorithm, a web page ranking algorithm

== See also ==
- Salza (disambiguation)
