= Project Sunroof =

Solar power initiative started by Google engineer Carl Elkin

- Mission statement: "Mapping the planet's solar potential, one roof at a time."
- Type of project: Solar Power Initiative
- Location: Boston, San Francisco, and Fresno
- Owner: Google
- Founder: Carl Elkin
- Established: August 17, 2015; 10 years ago
- Website: www.google.com/get/sunroof

Project Sunroof is a solar power initiative started by Google engineer Carl Elkin. The initiative's stated purpose is "mapping the planet's solar potential, one roof at a time."

== Method ==
Project Sunroof primarily works to encourage the private adoption of solar energy by providing a set of tools to facilitate the purchase and installation of solar panels. Using high-resolution 3D imagery data from Google Maps to calculate shadows from nearby structures and trees and taking into account historical weather and temperature patterns, the Project Sunroof website calculates how much money a user can expect to save yearly by making use of solar power. In addition, the Project Sunroof website also provides a list of local solar power retailers capable of installing solar panels in that area.

== History ==
Project Sunroof was created by Google engineer Carl Elkin as a 20% time project. While initially launching only in the cities of Boston, San Francisco, and Fresno, the project now displays solar potential for 43 million homes in the US. Google has previously invested in projects with solar energy provider, SolarCity.

While the solar insights provided by Project Sunroof were initially used to support individual rooftop solar insights, additional uses for the data have been developed by Google.

On the Project Sunroof website, Google launched the 'Data Explorer' to allow users to view aggregated solar insights, such as the total number of buildings viable for rooftop solar, or the aggregated solar potential (expressed in megawatts) for entire communities or cities.

In September 2018, Google launched the Environmental Insights Explorer platform. This tool was designed to make it easier for cities to measure their carbon footprint and take action in support of their climate goals. The tool provides estimates for a city's annual carbon emissions using detailed geospatial data derived from Google Maps. It provides an estimate of emissions from the sectors of Transportation and Buildings, and using Project Sunroof data, can also estimate the aggregated solar potential of an entire city to demonstrate the potential to offset emissions using solar energy.
