= Hilltop algorithm =

News search algorithm

The Hilltop algorithm is an algorithm used to find documents relevant to a particular keyword topic in news search. Created by Krishna Bharat while he was at Compaq Systems Research Center and George A. Mihăilă University of Toronto, it was acquired by Google for use in its news results in February 2003.

When you enter a query or keyword into the Google news search engine, the Hilltop algorithm helps to find relevant keywords whose results are more informative about the query or keyword.

The algorithm operates on a special index of expert documents. These are pages that are about a specific topic and have links to many non-affiliated pages on that topic. The original algorithm relied on independent directories with categorized links to sites. Results are ranked based on the match between the query and relevant descriptive text for hyperlinks on expert pages pointing to a given result page. Websites which have backlinks from many of the best expert pages are authorities and are ranked well.

Basically, it looks at the relationship between the "expert" and "authority" pages: an "expert" is a page that links to many other relevant documents; an "authority" is a page that has links pointing to it from the "expert" pages. Here they mean pages about a specific topic with links to many non-affiliated pages on that topic. If a website has backlinks from many of the best expert pages it will be an "authority".

== See also ==
- PageRank
- TrustRank
- HITS algorithm
- Domain authority
- Search engine optimization
