= Clever =

Clever may refer to:

== People ==
- Clever (musician), stage name of Joshua Tyler Huie (born 1985)

=== Given name ===
- Clever Ikisikpo, Nigerian politician
- Clever Lara (born 1952), Uruguayan artist

=== Surname ===
- Charles P. Clever (1830–1874), American politician
- Edith Clever (born 1940), German actress
- Todd Clever (born 1983), American rugby union player
- Willy Clever (1905–1969), German actor and screenwriter

== Other uses ==
- Clever, Missouri, a city
- CLEVER, a three-wheeled prototype vehicle
- CLEVER project, an IBM research project
- Clever (company), American educational technology company

== See also ==
- CleVR, application
