= Spam mass =

Website ranking measure

Spam mass is defined as "the measure of the impact of link spamming on a page's ranking." The concept was developed by Zoltán Gyöngyi and Hector Garcia-Molina of Stanford University in association with Pavel Berkhin and Jan Pedersen of Yahoo!. This paper expands upon their proposed TrustRank methodology.

The researchers developed a good core and a bad core of selected Web documents, from which they measured spam mass across a collection of documents. Two types of measurements, absolute mass and relative mass, are used to compare groups of documents. The higher the mass measurements, the more likely the documents are to be equivalent to spam.

== Thresholds ==
A threshold value is used to identify groups of documents as spam. If their relative mass value exceeds the threshold, the documents are considered to be spam. A second threshold for the PageRank values of the selected documents is applied. Only high PageRank documents are labelled as spam.

The purpose of the methodology is to identify spam documents with artificially inflated PageRank values.
