= Volunia =

Online search engine

- Website type: Web search engine
- Available in: 12 languages
- Website: volunia.com
- Commercial: Yes
- Registration: Optional
- Launched: 6 February 2012 (official launch); 14 June 2012 (public launch)
- Current status: Defunct

Volunia was a web search engine (or social search engine) created by Massimo Marchiori. It was launched in beta only for registered power users on February 6, 2012 and went live on June 14, 2012. Volunia, dubbed as "the search engine of the future", was speculated to be based on Hyper Search technology. On June 8, 2012, Marchiori announced with an open letter that he had been excluded from his project: six days later, on June 14, 2012, the site went live, but it ceased to operate in February 2014.

== History ==
The front page of Volunia, in March 2012.

The name Volunia stems from the words "volo" (flight) and "luna" (moon), because – as Marchiori said – he wanted to evoke the quantum leap his social search engine was trying to deliver. The Volunia project was entirely developed in Italy: the head office was located in Padua, the servers were located in Sardinia and hosted by Tiscali, and the whole team, formed by 14 people, was Italian.

== The project ==
Volunia differed from normal search engines in that, while it crawled the web and indexed websites, it built the ranking using the comments and opinions of other users. The Volunia service allowed people to interact with each other in every page they visit, as well as with the web sites' owners. Volunia used a system similar to Sidewiki. Volunia also introduced for the first time a "fly-over" map visualization for every web site, where every web site was turned into a city metaphor, also representing social information. According to Marchiori, Volunia was not meant to be a competitor to the existing search engines, staying on an alternative level. Despite what Marchiori had said, some people in the internet community considered Volunia a challenge and a potential competitor for Google.
