= Massimo Marchiori =

Italian mathematician and computer scientist

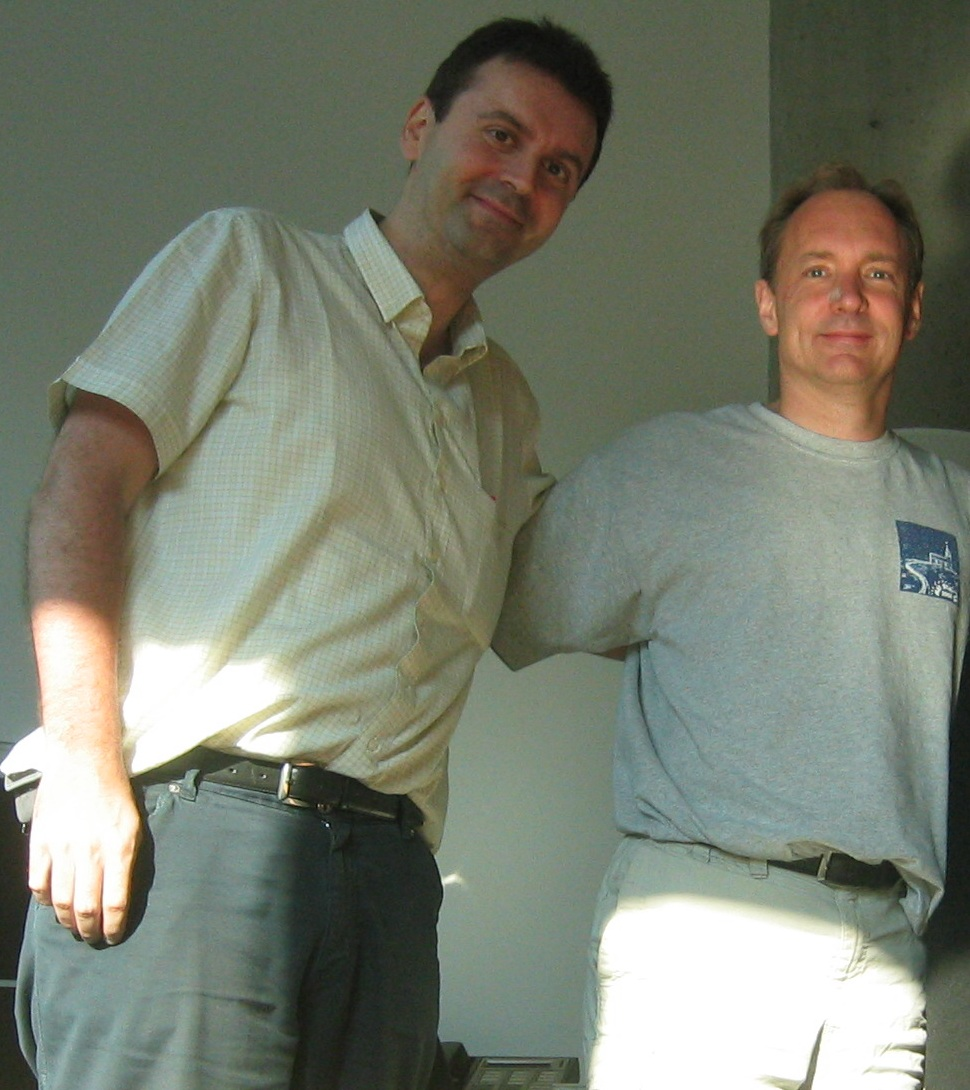
- Massimo Marchiori (left) with Tim Berners-Lee, 2006 at MIT
- Born: 1970 (age 55–56); Padua
- Education: Università di Padova, Centrum voor Wiskunde en Informatica
- Scientific career
- Thesis: Local Analysis and Localizations (1997)
- Doctoral advisor: Livio Colussi, Jan Willem Klop

Massimo Marchiori (Padua, 1970) is an Italian mathematician and computer scientist.

== Biography ==
In July 2004, he was awarded the TR35 prize by Technology Review (the best 35 researchers in the world under the age of 35).

He is Professor in Computer Science at the University of Padua, and Research Scientist at MIT's Computer Science and Artificial Intelligence Laboratory (CSAIL) in the World Wide Web Consortium.

He was the creator of HyperSearch, a search engine where the results were based not only on single page ranks, but on the relationship between single pages and the rest of the Web. Afterwards, Google co-founders Larry Page and Sergey Brin cited HyperSearch when they introduced PageRank.

He has been chief editor of the world standard for privacy on the Web (P3P), and co-author of the companion APPEL specification.

Initiator of the Query Languages effort at W3C (see for instance QL'98), he started the XML-Query project, deemed to develop the corresponding world standard for querying XML (XQuery), finally providing the due integration between the Web and the database world.

He co-developed the first version of the Web Ontology Language (OWL) standard.

In April 2010 he became the Chief Technology Officer of Atomium Culture.

He was the creator of the social search engine Volunia, launched in February 2012. On 8 June 2012 Marchiori announced, with an open letter, that he had been excluded from the CTO position in the company "because someone else wants to do it instead of me. This person wants to decide everything, without me. And so, he put himself into my shoes, commanding me to step aside".

He created Negapedia, the negative version of Wikipedia.
