= Salza =

Salza may refer to:

== Places ==
- Salza, Aude, France
- Salza di Pinerolo, Metropolitan City of Turin, Piedmont, Italy
- Salza Irpina, Avellino, Campania, Italy

== Rivers ==
- Salza (Saale), in Saxony-Anhalt, Germany
- Salza (Unstrut), in Thuringia, Germany
- Salza (Enns), in Austria

== People ==
- Hermann von Salza (1165–1239), fourth Grand Master of the Teutonic Knights
- Hermann Salza (1885–1946), an Estonian rear admiral
- Nicholas D'Antonio Salza (1916–2009), American bishop

== See also ==
- Salsa (disambiguation)
