= Genius hour =

Genius Hour is a project in the classroom and sometimes in a workplace where students or/and employees are allowed to explore their own passions and wonders for a depending amount of time, usually 1 hour per week to 20% of their total class time. Teachers allow students to pick a topic of their own, usually framed around an inquiry question, based on their own passions or wonders.

== Origin ==
Genius Hour originated from the 80/20 idea of many innovative companies, such as Google, where employees are given 20% of their time at work to work on their own projects. This system became very successful, with products such as Gmail, Google News, and 50% of Google's projects. This system was adopted by teachers later and used in the classroom to allow students to explore their passions.

== Process ==
A Genius Hour project begins with the selection of the topic and the essential or driving question. This question should be able to lead to further in-depth research, invention and/or community project/initiative stemming from their original topic. Some classes allow students to have many Genius Hour projects throughout the year while some ask students to choose something that will interest them all year long. Then, research is conducted on this topic to work towards the final product. The final product should be able to reflect on the findings of the research, and go beyond by analyzing the information found and provide the student's own discoveries. Lastly, there may be a reflection assignment, whether an essay, a presentation, etc.

== Goal ==
There are numerous benefits of Genius Hour. With students conducting in-depth research on topic that interests them, the student can learn more than from a traditional classroom, and be more focused in a direction that may benefit them in the future. Secondly, teachers can learn more about their students, their passions, how they learn, and many different aspects of a student. Also, Genius Hour allows more interactive and engaging learning. Students are passionate about the topics they picked, and will interact and engage more in the learning and research process, therefore, get more from the 20% of time. Genius Hour can also help students to explore possible future interests to learn about what they might be interested to pursue in the future. Furthermore, Genius Hour is based on the belief that "No longer is the teacher a dispenser of all knowledge, but students must be entrusted to make learning their own. Students need to do the hard work of critical thinking, creating, and contributing"
