= Side project time =

Form of employee benefit

As an employee benefit, some employers offer a guarantee that employees may work on their personal projects during some part (usually a percentage) of their time at work. Side project time is limited by two stipulations: what the employee works on is the intellectual property of their employer, and if requested, an explanation must be given as to how the project benefits the company in some way, even tangentially.

Google is credited for popularizing the practice that 20 percent of an employee's time may be used for side projects. At Google, this led to the development of products such as AdSense. While Gmail is frequently described as a 20% project, its creator Paul Buchheit states that it was never one. Though the program's continuity has been questioned, Google stated in 2020 that it remained an active program.

Other major companies that have at one time or another offered some or all of their employees the benefit include the BBC (10 percent of employee time), Apple (a few contiguous weeks yearly), and Atlassian (20 percent of employee time). Some companies, such as LinkedIn, have experimented with more restrictive versions in which employees must first pitch their projects to receive approval to work on them during company time.

Side project time has been criticized by some academics, such as Queens College sociology professor Abraham Walker, as "exploitative" because of how it grants employers the intellectual property rights over the personal business ideas of their employees that the employer would never have requested to be worked on otherwise.

== History ==
=== 3M and 15% time ===
The 15% project was an initiative established by 3M. At the time of this program's implementation, the United States' workforce was composed of highly inflexible employment opportunities in rigid business structures. WWII created an existential threat to 3M as natural rubber was needed for the war effort and scientists at 3M were given the freedom to work on a synthetic rubber. As WWII ended, 3M developed an ethos, "Innovate or die," that inspired the launch of this program. This original project had some successful outcomes; for example, during this side project time, Arthur Fry invented the Post-It Note.

=== Google implementation ===
In 2004, the founders of Google encouraged the system. Within Google, this initiative became known as the "20% Project." Employees were encouraged to spend up to 20 percent of their paid work time pursuing personal projects. The objective of the program was to inspire innovation in participating employees and ultimately increase company potential. Google's 20% Project was influenced by 3M's program. At Google AdSense arose out of side projects. While Gmail is frequently described as a 20% project, its creator Paul Buchheit states that it was never one.

As recognition of the benefits of retaining such a scheme grew, schools have replicated this system for their students in the classroom environment. The production of such creatively stimulated, ungraded work allows for students to experiment with ideas without fear of assessment and may increase their involvement in their general studies. Around 2013, some Google employees stated that the company had discontinued 20 percent time entirely or had it reworked from its original concept. However, the company stated in 2020 that 20 percent time still exists.

The 20% Project is responsible for the development of many Google services. Founders Sergey Brin and Larry Page advised that workers "spend 20% of their time working on what they think will most benefit Google". Susan Wojcicki utilised her time to create their product AdSense. Finally, developer Krishna Bharat created Google News as an individual pursuit and hobby.

=== Other companies ===
Australian enterprise company Atlassian has been using the 20% project since 2008. Co-founder Mike Cannon-Brookes stated that "innovation slows as the company grows." And as such, the scheme was introduced to re-inspire innovation. The induction of the system was a six-month trial, granting $1 million to engineers and allowing them to work on private projects based on personal interests. Part of this 20% time is their annual "Ship It" day, where employees are challenged with a task to create any product and then ship this item within 24 hours. Workers created products that ranged from refined beer to 'Jira' software updates.

== Notable projects ==
=== AdSense ===
The 20% Project aided in the development of AdSense, a program where publishers can produce media advertisements for a targeted audience. This service allows website publishers to generate revenue on a per-click basis. This service was publicly released on June 18, 2003. This service was envisioned by Gmail's founder, Paul Buchheit, who wanted appropriate ads to run throughout the Gmail service, but the project was pursued by Susan Wojcicki, who curated a team of developers who created the platform in their dedicated 20% time. After two years of its inception, the service was generating 15 percent of the company's revenue. The service can now offer ads in the form of simple text, flash video or rich media.

=== Google News ===
The news aggregator Google News is another result of the 20% Project. Google News was released in 2006, though the beta was introduced in September 2002. The creator of this service was Krishna Bharat, who developed this software in his dedicated project time.

=== Google Dremel ===
Dremel was conceived at Google in 2006 as a "20 percent" project by Andrey Gubarev.

=== Atlassian ===
In 2008, Atlassian announced its "20% Time Experiment", a six-month trial that was later extended to a full year. After six months of the project initiating, the company saw major improvements to Jira, Bamboo and Confluence. The Bamboo team introduced Stash 1.0 in May throughout the dedicated project time. Throughout two designated 'Innovation Week' workshops, the company shipped 12 features. At the end of the experiment, surveyed developers expressed that the biggest problem they faced was scheduling time for 20% work on top of the pressure to deliver new features and fix bugs. As a result, based on the number of developers who actually participated, the time allocated was closer to "1.1% Time."

A related initiative is Atlassian's quarterly 24-hour "ShipIt" hackathon, which allows employees to pursue any project. In the past, employees have used this time to refine Jira Service Desk and improve the Jira software for loading screens.

== Benefits and detriments ==
The 20% Project is designed to let employees experiment without the pressure of company decline or the threat of unemployment. For companies that thrive from the conception of services and products, innovative and entrepreneurial thought is vital to success.

However, for an operating business, productivity can be negatively affected by the 20% Project. The loss of time previously spent on major company-aligned projects can negatively affect a company's overall performance.

The allocation of this project time is not consistent. Former Google employee and Yahoo! CEO Marissa Mayer once stated "I've got to tell you the dirty little secret of Google's 20% time. It's really 120% time."

In 2013, Quartz described Google's 20% Project as "as good as dead". In Google executive Laszlo Bock's book, Work Rules!, he mentions that the concept has "waxed and waned." He states that workers in fact dedicate 10% of their time on personal projects, increasing focus time after the idea begins to "demonstrate impact." He mentions that "the idea of 20 per cent time is more important than the reality of it." Workers should always be driven towards individual innovation, yet it should operate "somewhat outside the lines of formal management."

Atlassian can be used as an example of the detriments of 20% time. Brookes implemented the 20% Project as a test to see if it produced any notable improvements or detriments to the company's output. They funded a six-month trial with one million Australian dollars. During this process, workers tackled inherent structural difficulties within the scheme. An employee mentioned that it was difficult to balance this 20% time "amongst all the pressures to deliver new features and bug fixes."; the program introduced more deadlines for their employees. As a result, the company found that this 20% Project in fact became 1.1% of their working time. Another issue faced was the difficulty in the organisation and team-work involved in the projects. As employees would organise groups to create new software, they would struggle to work with employees who had other commitments and alternate time schedules. The company blogs have included fewer references to the 20% Project over the last decade with references that this scheme loses effect in long-term practices. The company's 'Ship It' day still highlights the prosperity of time dedicated to employee-based innovation.

== See also ==
- Genius hour
