= Multi-document summarization =

Procedure extracting information from similar documents

Multi-document summarization is an automatic procedure aimed at extraction of information from multiple texts written about the same topic. The resulting summary report allows individual users, such as professional information consumers, to quickly familiarize themselves with information contained in a large cluster of documents. In such a way, multi-document summarization systems are complementing the news aggregators performing the next step down the road of coping with information overload.

== Key benefits and difficulties ==
Multi-document summarization creates information reports that are both concise and comprehensive. With different opinions being put together & outlined, every topic is described from multiple perspectives within a single document. While the goal of a brief summary is to simplify information search and cut the time by pointing to the most relevant source documents, comprehensive multi-document summary should in theory contain the required information, hence limiting the need for accessing original files to cases when refinement is required. In practice, it is hard to summarize multiple documents with conflicting views and biases. In fact, it is almost impossible to achieve clear extractive summarization of documents with conflicting views. Abstractive summarization is the preferred venue in this case.

Automatic summaries present information extracted from multiple sources algorithmically, without any editorial touch or subjective human intervention, thus making it completely unbiased. The difficulties remain, if doing automatic extractive summaries of documents with conflicting views.

== Technological challenges ==
The multi-document summarization task is more complex than summarizing a single document, even a long one. The difficulty arises from thematic diversity within a large set of documents. A good summarization technology aims to combine the main themes with completeness, readability, and concision. The Document Understanding Conferences, conducted annually by NIST, have developed sophisticated evaluation criteria for techniques accepting the multi-document summarization challenge.

An ideal multi-document summarization system not only shortens the source texts, but also presents information organized around the key aspects to represent diverse views. Success produces an overview of a given topic. Such text compilations should also follow basic requirements for an overview text compiled by a human. The multi-document summary quality criteria are as follows:

- clear structure, including an outline of the main content, from which it is easy to navigate to the full text sections
- text within sections is divided into meaningful paragraphs
- gradual transition from more general to more specific thematic aspects
- good readability.

The latter point deserves an additional note. Care is taken to ensure that the automatic overview shows:

- no paper-unrelated "information noise" from the respective documents (e.g., web pages)
- no dangling references to what is not mentioned or explained in the overview
- no text breaks across a sentence
- no semantic redundancy.

== Real-life systems ==
The multi-document summarization technology is now coming of age - a view supported by a choice of advanced web-based systems that are currently available.

- ReviewChomp presents summaries of customer reviews for any given product or service. Some products have thousands of online reviews which renders the reviews unreadable by humans in real time. Search for the product or service is performed by the website.
- Ultimate Research Assistant - performs text mining on Internet search results to help summarize and organize them and make it easier for the user to perform online research. Specific text mining techniques used by the tool include concept extraction, text summarization, hierarchical concept clustering (e.g., automated taxonomy generation), and various visualization techniques, including tag clouds and mind maps.
- iResearch Reporter - Commercial Text Extraction and Text Summarization system, free demo site accepts user-entered query, passes it on to Google search engine, retrieves multiple relevant documents, produces categorized, easily readable natural language summary reports covering multiple documents in retrieved set, all extracts linked to original documents on the Web, post-processing, entity extraction, event and relationship extraction, text extraction, extract clustering, linguistic analysis, multi-document, full text, natural language processing, categorization rules, clustering, linguistic analysis, text summary construction tool set.
- Newsblaster is a system that helps users find news that is of the most interest to them. The system automatically collects, clusters, categorizes, and summarizes news from several sites on the web (CNN, Reuters, Fox News, etc.) on a daily basis, and it provides users an interface to browse the results.
- NewsInEssence may be used to retrieve and summarize a cluster of articles from the web. It can start from a URL and retrieve documents that are similar, or it can retrieve documents that match a given set of keywords. NewsInEssence also downloads news articles daily and produces news clusters from them.
- NewsFeed Researcher is a news portal performing continuous automatic summarization of documents initially clustered by the news aggregators (e.g., Google News). NewsFeed Researcher is backed by a free online engine covering major events related to business, technology, U.S. and international news. This tool is also available in on-demand mode allowing a user to build a summaries on selected topics.
- Scrape This is like a search engine, but instead of providing links to the most relevant websites based on a query, it scrapes the pertinent information off of the relevant websites and provides the user with a consolidated multi-document summary, along with dictionary definitions, images, and videos.
- JistWeb is a query specific multiple document summariser.

As auto-generated multi-document summaries increasingly resemble the overviews written by a human, their use of extracted text snippets may one day face copyright issues in relation to the fair use copyright concept.

== Bibliography ==
- Erkan, G.; Radev, D. R. (2004). "LexRank: Graph-based Lexical Centrality as Salience in Text Summarization". Journal of Artificial Intelligence Research. 22: 457–479. arXiv:1109.2128. doi:10.1613/JAIR.1523.
- Radev, Dragomir R.; Jing, Hongyan; Styś, Małgorzata; Tam, Daniel (2004). "Centroid-based summarization of multiple documents" (PDF). Information Processing & Management. 40 (6): 919–938. Bibcode:2004IPM....40..919R. doi:10.1016/j.ipm.2003.10.006.
- Kathleen R. McKeown and Dragomir R. Radev. Generating summaries of multiple news articles. In Proceedings, ACM Conference on Research and Development in Information Retrieval SIGIR'95, pages 74–82, Seattle, Washington, July 1995.
- C.-Y. Lin, E. Hovy, "From single to multi-document summarization: A prototype system and its evaluation", In "Proceedings of the ACL", pp. 457–464, 2002
- Kathleen McKeown, Rebecca J. Passonneau, David K. Elson, Ani Nenkova, Julia Hirschberg, "Do Summaries Help? A Task-Based Evaluation of Multi-Document Summarization", SIGIR’05, Salvador, Brazil, August 15–19, 2005
- Barzilay, R.; Elhadad, N. (2002). "Inferring Strategies for Sentence Ordering in Multidocument News Summarization". Journal of Artificial Intelligence Research. 17: 35–55. arXiv:1106.1820. doi:10.1613/jair.991.
- M. Soubbotin, S. Soubbotin, "Trade-Off Between Factors Influencing Quality of the Summary", Document Understanding Workshop (DUC), Vancouver, B.C., Canada, October 9–10, 2005
- Chowdary, C. Ravindranath; Kumar, P. Sreenivasa (2009). "ESUM: An Efficient System for Query-Specific Multi-document Summarization". Advances in Information Retrieval. Lecture Notes in Computer Science. Vol. 5478. Berlin Heidelberg: Springer. pp. 724–728. doi:10.1007/978-3-642-00958-7_74. ISBN 978-3-642-00957-0.

== See also ==
- Automatic summarization
- Text mining
- News aggregators
