= SocialRank =

SocialRank (also called Social PageRank) is an algorithm that assigns a numerical weighting to each node in a Social networking service, with the purpose of measuring the node's - or the person's - relative importance or influence within the network. One approach to define a SocialRank is to calculate a superposition of attention that a node directly receives and SocialRank of its neighborhood. This definition partly follows the idea of Google's PageRank and means that the SocialRank of a person depends on autonomous value and on the SocialRank of other people that link to it. SocialRank is useful for characterizing communication networks such as Email or Instant Messaging, but it is particularly well-suited to describe users of Web 2.0 services such as Contact Management sites.
