= CheiRank =

Metric used for ranking web pages

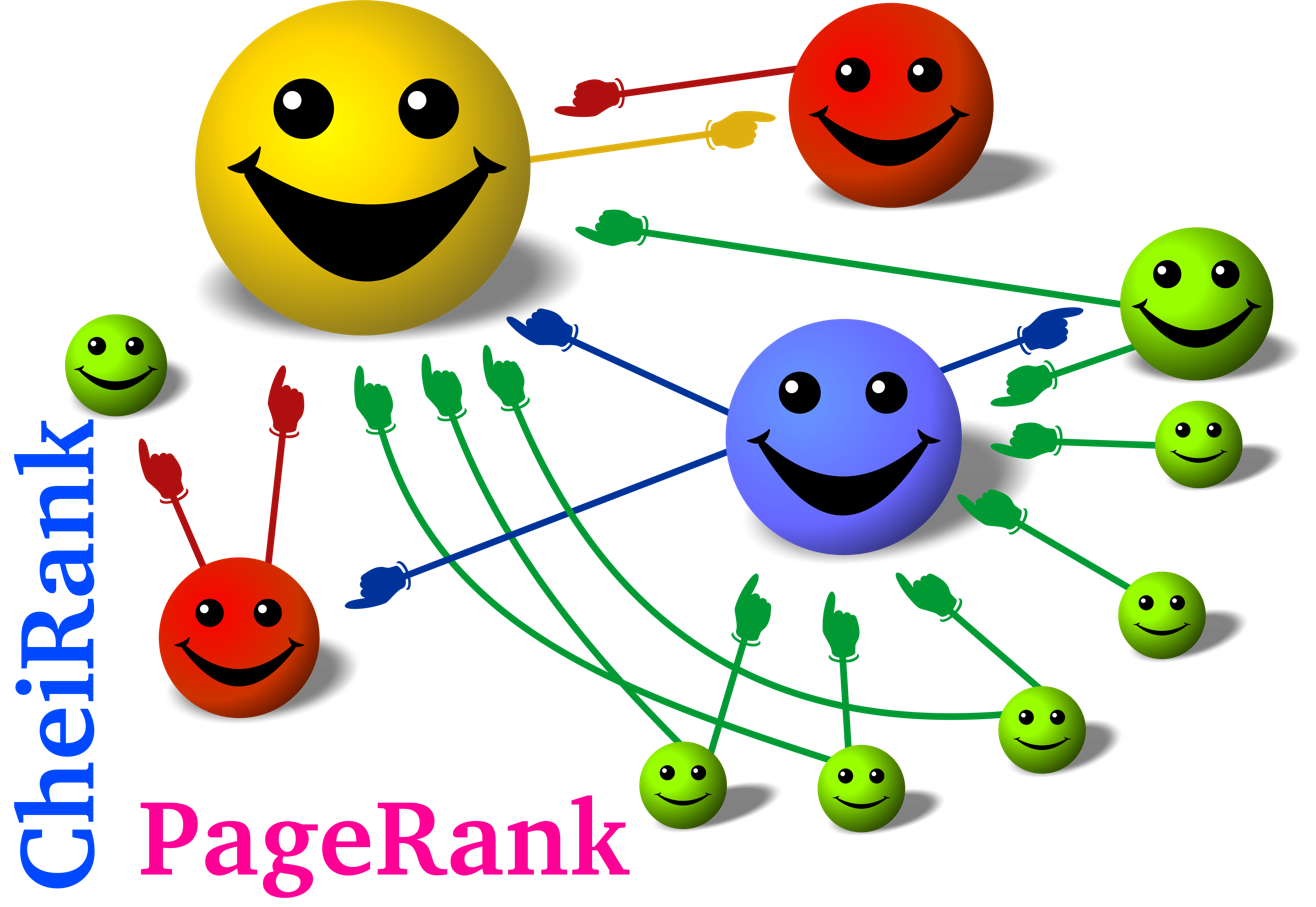
Nodes with links in the plane of PageRank and CheiRank

The CheiRank is an eigenvector with a maximal real eigenvalue of the Google matrix $G^*$ constructed for a directed network with inverted link directions. It is complementary to the PageRank vector, which ranks nodes based on their number of incoming links. Due to the inversion of link directions, CheiRank measures a node's outgoing connectivity. Combining both vectors yields a two-dimensional ranking of information flow across a directed network.

== Definition ==
Fig. 1. Distribution of procedure calls of the Linux kernel network in the plane of PageRank probability $x = \log_{10} P_i$ and CheiRank probability $y = \log_{10} {P}^*_i$ for Linux version 2.6.32 with matrix size $N=285509$ at $\alpha=0.85$; color shows the density of nodes, with white for maximum and blue for minimum; black space has no nodes (from Chepelianskii)

For a given directed network, the Google matrix is constructed as described in the article Google matrix. The PageRank vector is the eigenvector with the maximal real eigenvalue $\lambda=1$. It was introduced in and is discussed in the article PageRank. In a similar way, the CheiRank is the eigenvector with the maximal real eigenvalue of the matrix $G^*$ built in the same way as $G$ but using the inverted direction of links in the initially given adjacency matrix. Both matrices $G$ and $G^*$ belong to the class of Perron–Frobenius operators, and according to the Perron–Frobenius theorem the CheiRank $P^*_i$ and PageRank $P_i$ eigenvectors have nonnegative components which can be interpreted as probabilities. Thus all $N$ nodes $i$ of the network can be ordered in decreasing probability order with ranks $K^*_i, K_i$ for CheiRank and PageRank $P^*_i, P_i$ respectively. On average the PageRank probability $P_i$ is proportional to the number of ingoing links with $P_i \propto 1/{K_i}^\beta$. For the World Wide Web (WWW) network, the exponent $\beta =1/(\nu-1) \approx 0.9$ where $\nu \approx 2.1$ is the exponent for the ingoing links distribution. In a similar way, the CheiRank probability is on average proportional to the number of outgoing links with $P^*_i \propto 1/{K^*_i}^{\beta^*}$ with $\beta^* =1/(\nu^*-1) \approx 0.6$ where $\nu^* \approx 2.7$ is the exponent for the outgoing links distribution of the WWW. The CheiRank was introduced for the procedure call network of Linux kernel software, and the term itself was used by Zhirov. While PageRank highlights very well known and popular nodes, the CheiRank highlights very communicative nodes. Top PageRank and CheiRank nodes have a certain analogy to authorities and hubs appearing in the HITS algorithm, but HITS is query dependent whereas the rank probabilities $P_i$ and $P^*_i$ classify all nodes of the network. Since each node belongs both to CheiRank and PageRank, we obtain a two-dimensional ranking of network nodes. There have been early studies of PageRank in networks with inverted direction of links, but the properties of two-dimensional ranking had not been analyzed in detail.

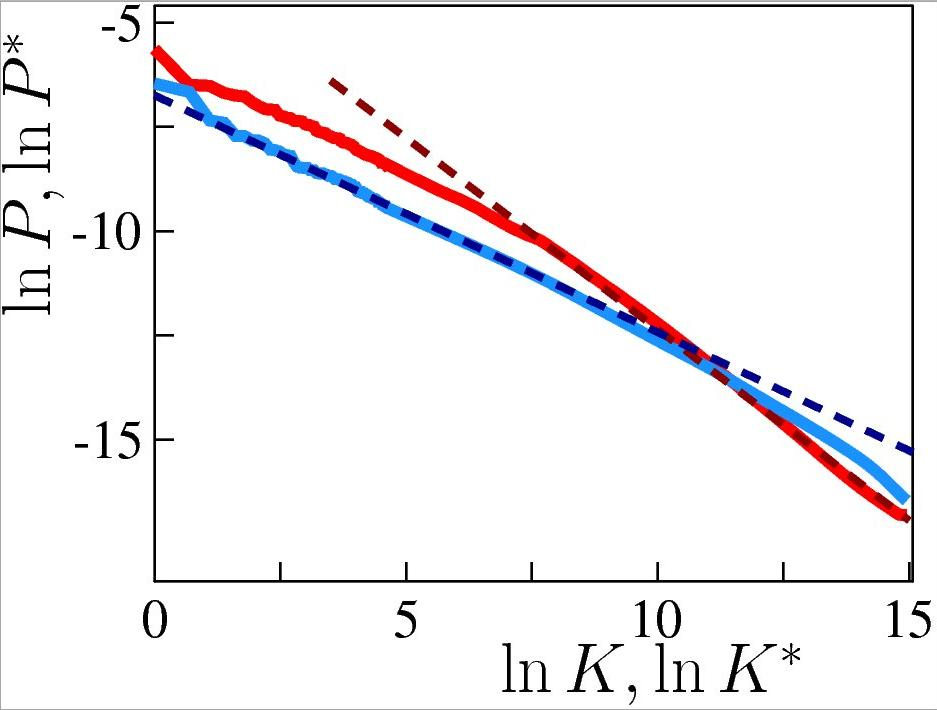
Fig. 2. Dependence of probability of PageRank $P$ (red curve) and CheiRank $P^*$ (blue curve) on the corresponding rank indexes $K$ and $K^*$. The straight dashed lines show the power-law dependence with the slope $\beta=0.92; 0.57$ respectively, corresponding to $\beta=1/(\nu-1)$ (from Zhirov)

== Examples ==
An example of node distribution in the plane of PageRank and CheiRank is shown in Fig. 1 for the procedure call network of Linux kernel software.

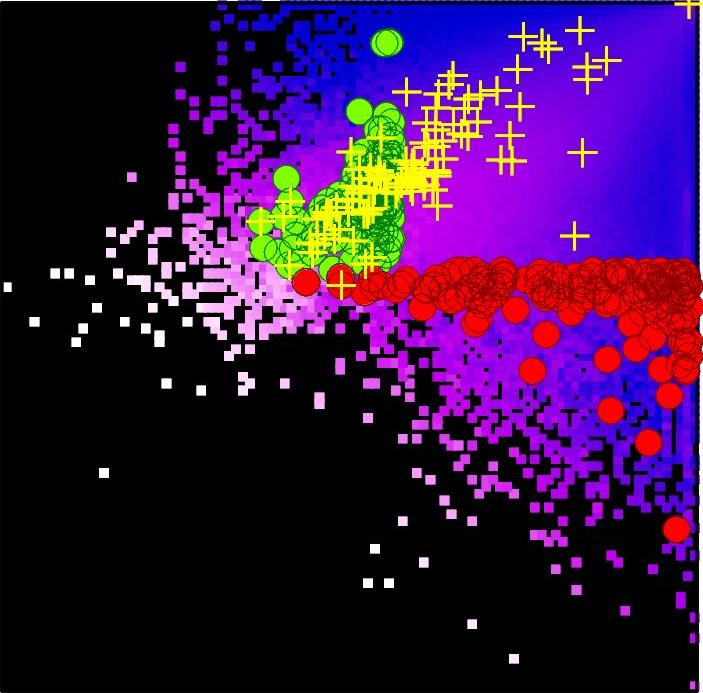
Fig. 3. Density distribution of Wikipedia English articles (2009) in the plane of PageRank and CheiRank indexes $0 < \ln K, \ln K^* < \ln N$, shown by color with blue for minimum and white for maximum (black for zero); green/red points show the top 100 personalities from PageRank/CheiRank; yellow pluses show the top 100 personalities from Hart's book; number of articles $N = 3282257$ (from Zhirov)

The dependence of $P, P^*$ on $K, K^*$ for the hyperlink network of Wikipedia English articles is shown in Fig. 2 from Zhirov. The distribution of these articles in the plane of PageRank and CheiRank is shown in Fig. 3 from Zhirov. The difference between PageRank and CheiRank is clearly seen from the names of Wikipedia articles (2009) with highest rank. At the top of PageRank we have 1. United States, 2. United Kingdom, 3. France, while for CheiRank we find 1. Portal:Contents/Outline of knowledge/Geography and places, 2. List of state leaders by year, 3. Portal:Contents/Index/Geography and places. Clearly, PageRank selects first articles on a broadly known subject with a large number of ingoing links, while CheiRank selects first highly communicative articles with many outgoing links. Since the articles are distributed in 2D, they can be ranked in various ways corresponding to projection of the 2D set on a line. The horizontal and vertical lines correspond to PageRank and CheiRank; 2DRank combines the properties of CheiRank and PageRank as discussed by Zhirov. It gives top Wikipedia articles 1. India, 2. Singapore, 3. Pakistan.

The 2D ranking highlights the properties of Wikipedia articles in a new manner. According to PageRank, the top 100 personalities described in Wikipedia articles fall into five main categories of activity: 58 (politics), 10 (religion), 17 (arts), 15 (science), 0 (sport), and thus the importance of politicians is strongly overestimated. The CheiRank gives respectively 15, 1, 52, 16, 16, while for 2DRank one finds 24, 5, 62, 7, 2. This type of 2D ranking can find useful applications for various complex directed networks including the WWW.

CheiRank and PageRank naturally appear for the world trade network, or international trade, where they are linked with export and import flows for a given country respectively.

Possibilities for the development of two-dimensional search engines based on PageRank and CheiRank are considered. Directed networks can be characterized by the correlator between PageRank and CheiRank vectors: in certain networks this correlator is close to zero (e.g., Linux kernel network), while other networks have large correlator values (e.g., Wikipedia or university networks).

== Simple network example ==
Fig. 4. Example of a directed network

Fig. 5. Related matrix $S$

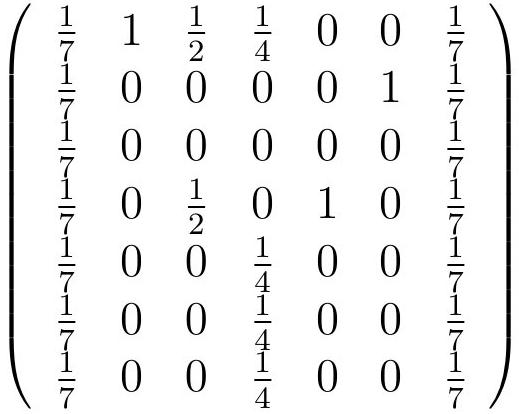
Fig. 6. Related matrix $S^*$

A simple example of the construction of the Google matrices $G$ and $G^*$, used for determination of the related PageRank and CheiRank vectors, is given below. The directed network example with 7 nodes is shown in Fig. 4. The matrix $S$, built with the rules described in the article Google matrix, is shown in Fig. 5; the related Google matrix is $G=\alpha S + (1-\alpha)e e^{T}/N$ and the PageRank vector is the right eigenvector of $G$ with the unit eigenvalue ($G P=P$). In a similar way, to determine the CheiRank eigenvector all directions of links in Fig. 4 are inverted; then the matrix $S^*$ is built, according to the same rules applied for the network with inverted link directions, as shown in Fig. 6. The related Google matrix is $G^*=\alpha S^* + (1-\alpha)e e^{T}/N$ and the CheiRank vector is the right eigenvector of $G^*$ with the unit eigenvalue ($G^* P^*=P^*$). Here $\alpha \approx 0.85$ is the damping factor taken at its usual value.

== See also ==
- PageRank, HITS algorithm, Google matrix
- Markov chains, Transfer operator, Perron–Frobenius theorem
- Information retrieval
- Web search engines
