= Jon Kleinberg =

American computer scientist (born 1971)

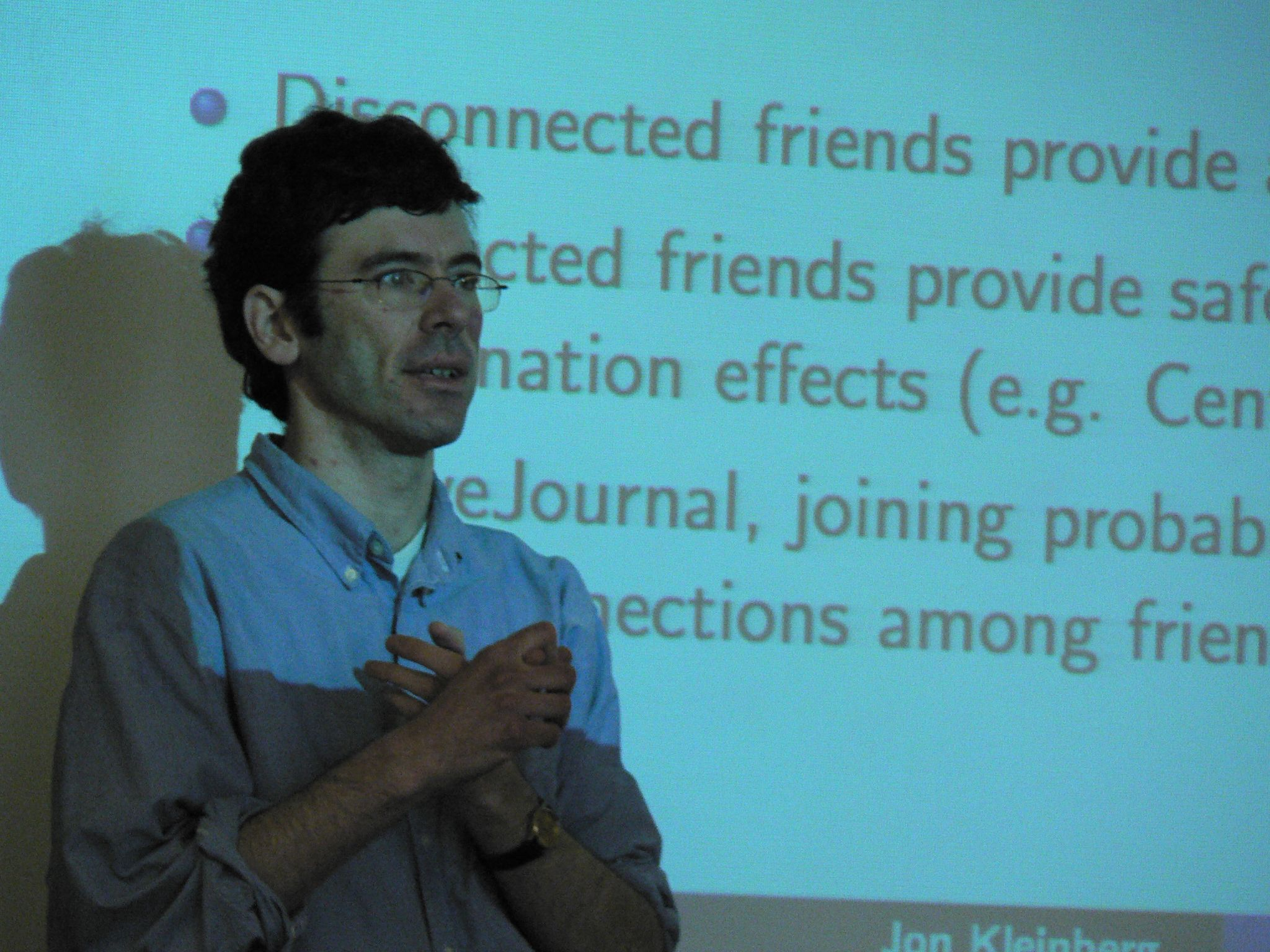
- Kleinberg speaking at the Cornell/Microsoft Research International Symposium on Self-Organizing Online Communities
- Born: Jon Michael Kleinberg; 1971 (age 54–55); Boston, Massachusetts
- Education: Cornell University; Massachusetts Institute of Technology
- Known for: HITS algorithm
- Awards: MacArthur Fellowship (2005); Nevanlinna Prize (2006); ACM-Infosys Foundation Award (2008); Harvey Prize (2013); Allen Newell Award (2014)
- Scientific career
- Fields: Computer Science
- Workplaces: MIT; Cornell University; IBM Almaden Research Center
- Thesis: Approximation algorithms for disjoint paths problems (1996)
- Doctoral advisor: Michel Goemans
- Website: videolectures.net/jon_kleinberg www.cs.cornell.edu/home/kleinber/

Jon Michael Kleinberg (born 1971) is an American computer scientist and the Tisch University Professor of Computer Science and Information Science at Cornell University known for his work in algorithms and networks. He is a recipient of the Nevanlinna Prize by the International Mathematical Union.

== Early life and education ==
Jon Kleinberg was born in 1971 in Boston, Massachusetts to Eugene Kleinberg, a mathematics professor at SUNY Buffalo, and Evelyn Kleinberg, a computer science researcher. His grandfather, Samuel Kleinberg, graduated from Cornell in 1934 and was a teacher of mathematics and physics at a high school in Brooklyn. He received a Bachelor of Science degree in computer science from Cornell University in 1993 and a PhD from Massachusetts Institute of Technology in 1996. He is the older brother of fellow Cornell computer scientist Robert Kleinberg.

== Career ==
Since 1996 Kleinberg has been a professor in the Department of Computer Science at Cornell, as well as a visiting scientist at IBM's Almaden Research Center. His work has been supported by an NSF Career Award, an ONR Young Investigator Award, a MacArthur Foundation Fellowship, a Packard Foundation Fellowship, a Sloan Foundation Fellowship, and grants from Google, Yahoo!, and the NSF. He is a member of the National Academy of Engineering and the American Academy of Arts and Sciences. In 2011, he was elected to the United States National Academy of Sciences. In 2013 he became a fellow of the Association for Computing Machinery.

== Research ==
Kleinberg is best known for his work on networks. One of his best-known contributions is the HITS algorithm, developed while he was at IBM. HITS is an algorithm for web search that builds on the eigenvector-based methods used in algorithms and served as the full-scale model for PageRank by recognizing that web pages or sites should be considered important not only if they are linked to by many others (as in PageRank), but also if they link to many others. Search engines themselves are examples of sites that are important because they link to many others. Kleinberg realized that this generalization implies two different classes of important web pages, which he called "hubs" and "authorities". The HITS algorithm is an algorithm for automatically identifying the leading hubs and authorities in a network of hyperlinked pages.

Kleinberg is also known for his work on algorithmic aspects of the small world experiment. He was one of the first to realize that Stanley Milgram's famous "six degrees" letter-passing experiment implied not only that there are short paths between individuals in social networks but also that people seem to be good at finding those paths, an apparently simple observation that turns out to have profound implications for the structure of the networks in question. The formal model in which Kleinberg studied this question is a two dimensional grid, where each node has both short-range connections (edges) to neighbours in the grid and long-range connections to nodes further apart. For each node v, a long-range edge between v and another node w is added with a probability that decays as the second power of the distance between v and w. This is generalized to a d-dimensional grid, where the probability decays as the d-th power of the distance.

Kleinberg has written numerous papers and articles as well as a textbook on computer algorithms, Algorithm Design, co-authored with Éva Tardos. Among other honors, he received a MacArthur Foundation Fellowship also known as the "genius grant" in 2005 and the Nevanlinna Prize in 2006, an award that is given out once every four years along with the Fields Medal as the premier distinction in Computational Mathematics. In 2010 he published his book "Networks, Crowds, and Markets: Reasoning About a Highly Connected World" at Cambridge University Press.

Cornell's Association of Computer Science Undergraduates awarded him the "Faculty of the Year" award in 2002.
