= Krishna Bharat =

Indian-American research scientist

- Born: 7 January 1970 (age 56); Bengaluru, India
- Citizenship: American
- Education: IIT Madras; Georgia Institute of Technology
- Occupation: Research scientist at Google
- Children: 3

Krishna Bharat (born 7 January 1970) is an Indian-American computer scientist at Google Inc. He was formerly a founding adviser for Grokstyle Inc. a visual search company and Laserlike Inc., an interest search engine startup based on Machine Learning.

At Google, Mountain View, he led a team developing Google News, a service that automatically indexes over 25,000 news websites in more than 35 languages to provide a summary of the News resources. He created Google News in the aftermath of the September 11, 2001 attacks to keep himself abreast of the developments. Since then, it has been a popular offering from Google's services. Google News was one of Google's first endeavors beyond offering just plain text searches on its page.

Among other projects, he opened the Google India's Research and Development center at Bengaluru, India. Bharat is on the Board of Visitors of Columbia Journalism School and John S. Knight Journalism Fellowships at Stanford.

== Education ==
Bharat completed his schooling from St. Joseph's Boys' High School in Bengaluru, and received an undergraduate degree in computer science from the Indian Institute of Technology, Madras. He subsequently received a Ph.D. from Georgia Tech in Human Computer Interaction.

== Career ==
Before joining Google in 1999, he worked at the DEC Systems Research Center where, with George Mihaila, he developed the Hilltop algorithm.

=== Tenure at Google ===
At Google he developed so-called LocalRank, which can be considered to be an adaptation of Hilltop.

He worked on web search and information extraction at Google between 1999 and 2015, and left Google in 2015 to become a founding adviser for Laserlike, a machine learning software startup, which was acquired by Apple in 2019. Krishna Bharat rejoined Google in July 2019 as a distinguished research scientist.

== Awards ==
In 2015, Krishna received the Distinguished Alumnus Award from his alma mater IIT Madras.

He received the 2003 World Technology Award for Media & Journalism.
