= SALSA (food standard) =

British food standard

SALSA (Safe and Local Supplier Approval) is a British food standard.

== History ==
SALSA was set up in 2007 by the British Hospitality Association, British Retail Consortium and Food and Drink Federation.

== Structure ==
The organization regulating SALSA is headquartered in Oxfordshire.

== See also ==
- Assured Food Standards
