= Hyper Search =

Method of link analysis for search engines

Hyper Search is a method of link analysis for search engines. It was created by Italian researcher Massimo Marchiori.

== Bibliography ==
- Massimo Marchiori, "The Quest for Correct Information on the Web: Hyper Search Engines", Proceedings of the Sixth International World Wide Web Conference (WWW6), 1997.
- Sergey Brin and Lawrence Page, "The anatomy of a large-scale hypertextual Web search engine", Proceedings of the Seventh International World Wide Web Conference (WWW7), 1998.

== See also ==
- PageRank
- Spamdexing
- PR
