= Link building =

Efforts to increase the number of high-quality links pointing to a website

In the field of search engine optimization (SEO), link building describes actions aimed at increasing the number and quality of inbound links to a webpage intending to increase the search engine rankings of that page or website. Briefly, link building is the process of establishing relevant hyperlinks (usually called links) to a website from external sites. Link building can increase the number of high-quality links pointing to a website, in turn increasing the likelihood of the website ranking highly in search engine results. Link building is also a proven marketing tactic for increasing brand awareness.

== Link types ==
=== Editorial link ===
Editorial links are links not acquired by paying money, asking, trading or exchanging. These links are attracted because of the good content and marketing strategies of a website. These are the links that the website owner does not need to ask for as they are naturally given by other website owners.

=== Resource link ===
Resource links are a category of links, which can be either one-way or two-way, usually referenced as "Resources" or "Information" in navbars, but sometimes, especially in the early, less compartmentalized years of the Web, simply called "links". Basically, they are hyperlinks to a website or a specific web page containing content believed to be beneficial, useful and relevant to visitors of the site establishing the link.

In recent years, resource links have grown in importance because most major search engines have made it plain that—in Google's words—"quantity, quality, and relevance of links count towards your rating".

Search engines measure a website's value and relevance by analyzing the links to the site from other websites. The resulting “link popularity” is a measure of the number and quality of links to a website. It is an integral part of a website's ranking in search engines. Search engines examine each of the links to a particular website to determine its value. Although every link to a website is a vote in its favor, not all votes are counted equally. A website with similar subject matter to the website receiving the inbound link carries more weight than an unrelated site, and a well-regarded website (such as a university) has higher link quality than an unknown or disreputable website.

The text of links helps search engines categorize a website. The engines' insistence on resource links being relevant and beneficial developed because many artificial link building methods were employed solely to spam search engines, i.e. to "fool" the engines' algorithms into awarding the sites employing these unethical devices undeservedly high page ranks and/or return positions.

Google has cautioned site developers to avoid "free-for-all" links, link-popularity schemes, and the submission of a site to thousands of search engines, given that these tactics are typically useless exercises that do not affect the ranking of a site in the results of the major search engines. For many years now, the major search engines have deployed technology designed to "red flag" and potentially penalize sites employing such practices.

=== Acquired link ===
These are the links acquired by the website owner through payment or distribution. They are also known as organically obtained links. Such links include link advertisements, paid linking, article distribution, directory links and comments on forums, blogs, articles and other interactive forms of social media.

==== Reciprocal link ====
A reciprocal link is a mutual link between two objects, commonly between two websites, to ensure mutual traffic. For example, Alice and Bob have websites. If Bob's website links to Alice's website and Alice's website links to Bob's website, the websites are reciprocally linked. Website owners often submit their sites to reciprocal link exchange directories in order to achieve higher rankings in the search engines. Reciprocal linking between websites is no longer an important part of the search engine optimization process. In 2005, with their Jagger 2 update, Google stopped giving credit to reciprocal links as it does not indicate genuine link popularity.

==== Blog and forum comments ====
User-generated content such as blog and forum comments with links can drive valuable referral traffic if it's well-thought-out and pertains to the discussion of the post on the blog. However, these links almost always contain the Nofollow or the newer ugc attribute which signal that Google shouldn't take these into its ranking considerations.

==== Directory link ====
Website directories are lists of links to websites which are sorted into categories. Website owners can submit their site to many of these directories. Some directories accept payment for listing in their directory while others are free.

=== Social bookmarking ===
Social bookmarking is a way of saving and categorizing web pages in a public location on the web. Because bookmarks have anchor text and are shared and stored publicly, they are scanned by search engine crawlers and have search engine optimization value.

=== Image linking ===
Image linking is a way of submitting images, such as infographics, to image directories and linking them back to a specific URL.

=== Guest blogging ===
Also known as guest posting, it is a popular SEO technique that consists of writing a piece of content for another website with the goal of getting more visibility and possibly linking back to the author's website. According to Google, such links are considered unnatural and should generally contain the Nofollow attribute.

== Black hat link building ==
In early incarnations, when Google's algorithm relied on incoming links as an indicator of website success, Black Hat SEOs manipulated website rankings by creating link-building schemes, such as building subsidiary websites to send links to a primary website. With an abundance of incoming links, the prime website outranked many reputable sites. However, the conflicts of being devalued by major search engines while building links could be caused by web owners using other black hat strategies. Google's spam policies define link spam as creating links to or from a site primarily to manipulate search rankings. Examples listed by Google include buying or selling links for ranking purposes, excessive link exchanges, low-quality directory or bookmark site links, and using automated programs or services to create links.

The Penguin algorithm was created to eliminate this type of abuse. At the time, Google clarified its definition of a "bad" link: “Any links intended to manipulate a site’s ranking in Google search results may be considered part of a link scheme.”

With Penguin, it wasn't the quantity of links that improved a site's rankings but the quality. Since then, Google's web spam team has attempted to prevent the manipulation of their search results through link building. Major brands including J.C. Penney, BMW, Forbes, Overstock.com, and many others have received severe penalties to their search rankings for employing spammy and non-user-friendly link building tactics.

On October 5, 2014, Google launched a new algorithm update Penguin 3.0 to penalize those sites that use black hat link building tactics to build unnatural links to manipulate search engines. The update affected 0.3% of English-language queries all over the world.

Black hat SEO could also be referred to as Spamdexing, which utilizes other black SEO strategies and link building tactics. Some black hat link building strategies include getting unqualified links from and participating in Link farm, link schemes and Doorway page. Black Hat SEO could also refer to "negative SEO," the practice of deliberately harming another website's performance.

== White hat link building ==
White hat link building strategies are those strategies that add value to end users, abide by Google's terms of service and produce good results that could be sustained for a long time. White hat link building strategies focus on producing high-quality as well as relevant links to the website. Although more difficult to acquire, white hat link building tactics are widely implemented by website owners because such kind of strategies are not only beneficial to their websites' long-term development but also good for the overall online environment.

== See also ==
- Deep linking: linking directly to a page within another website.
- Inline linking: linking directly to content within another website.
- Internal link: linking directly to content within your own website.
- Overlinking
- PageRank: an algorithm used by Google Search to rank websites in their search engine results.
