= Metric =

Metric or metrical may refer to:

== Measuring ==
- Metric system, an internationally adopted decimal system of measurement
- An adjective indicating relation to measurement in general, or a noun describing a specific type of measurement

== Mathematics ==
In mathematics, metric may refer to one of two related, but distinct concepts:

- A function which measures distance between two points in a metric space
- A metric tensor, in differential geometry, which allows defining lengths of curves, angles, and distances in a manifold

== Natural sciences ==
- Metric tensor (general relativity), the fundamental object of study in general relativity, similar to the gravitational field in Newtonian physics
- Senses related to measurement:
  - Metric system, an internationally adopted decimal system of measurement
  - Metric units, units related to a metric system
  - International System of Units, or Système International (SI), the most widely used metric system
- METRIC, a model that uses Landsat satellite data to compute and map evapotranspiration (ET) in climatology/meteorology

== Engineering and business ==
The word metric is often used to mean a descriptive statistic, indicator, or figure of merit used to describe or measure something quantitatively, including:

- Performance indicator, a measure of an organization's activities and performance
- Metrics (networking), the properties of a communication path used by a router to make routing decisions
- Software metric, a measure of some property of a piece of software or its specifications
- Reuse metrics, a quantitative indicator of an attribute for software reuse and reusability
- Search engine optimization metrics, indicators of a website's organic search potential

== Music ==
- Alex Metric (born 1984), British musician, DJ and producer
- Metric (band), a Canadian rock band founded in Toronto, Ontario

== Other uses ==
- Metre (poetry), the rhythmic structure of poetry
- Font metrics, properties describing the overall shape of a font

== See also ==
- Meter (disambiguation)
- Metrecal, a diet drink introduced in the 1960s
- Metric conversion (disambiguation)
- Metric dimension (disambiguation)
- Metric gauge (disambiguation)
