= Hot link =

Hot link may refer to:

- Hot link (sausage)
- Hyperlink
- Inline linking
- Deep linking
