= Server test =

Doctrine in United States copyright law

The server test is a doctrine in United States copyright law concerning whether a website directly infringes a copyright owner's exclusive right to display a work by embedding or in-line linking to content stored on another server. Under the test, a website generally does not directly infringe the public display right merely by using HTML instructions to cause a user's browser to retrieve and display an image or other work from a third-party server. The doctrine focuses on whether the defendant stores and transmits a copy of the copyrighted work from its own server.

The test was adopted by the United States Court of Appeals for the Ninth Circuit in Perfect 10, Inc. v. Amazon.com, Inc., a copyright case involving Google's image-search service. It has been applied by courts in the Ninth Circuit and reaffirmed by the Ninth Circuit in Hunley v. Instagram, LLC, but was rejected as the governing standard by the United States Court of Appeals for the Fifth Circuit in 2026. The Fifth Circuit instead focused on whether the embedding party transmitted a copy of the work, an approach the court said would likely produce results similar to the server test in many cases.

The doctrine is significant in disputes over linking, framing, hotlinking, social-media embedding, image search, news aggregation and other internet practices in which content appears on one website or application while the underlying file remains hosted elsewhere.

== Background ==
The Copyright Act of 1976 gives copyright owners several exclusive rights, including the rights to reproduce a copyrighted work and to display it publicly. The Act defines "display" as showing a copy of a work, either directly or by means of a device or process.

The server test developed from litigation over how those rights apply to web technologies. In-line linking and embedding allow one webpage to include code that causes a user's browser to retrieve content from a different server. To the user, the image, video or other content may appear as part of the embedding webpage, even though the embedding website has not downloaded and stored the file on its own server.

The legal question is whether the embedding website has "displayed" a copyrighted work within the meaning of the Copyright Act, or whether the display is made by the website that hosts and transmits the underlying copy. Courts applying the server test have treated the location of the copy as central to that inquiry.

== Development in Perfect 10 ==
The server test was adopted by the Ninth Circuit in Perfect 10, Inc. v. Amazon.com, Inc., a 2007 case involving Google's image-search service. Perfect 10 alleged that Google infringed its copyrights by displaying thumbnail versions of Perfect 10 images and by linking to full-size images located on third-party websites.

The Ninth Circuit distinguished between two types of images. Google stored thumbnail versions of images on its own servers and transmitted those thumbnails to users. By contrast, full-size images appeared through HTML instructions that directed a user's browser to retrieve the images from third-party websites. The court held that Google could display a copy of the thumbnails because those files were stored on Google's servers, but that Google did not display a copy of the full-size images for purposes of the Copyright Act because Google's computers did not store those images.

The court explained that HTML instructions are not themselves photographic images. Under the server test, a website publisher does not directly display a copyrighted image merely by providing instructions that direct a user's browser to another website where the image is stored. Instead, the website that stores and transmits the copy supplies the image to the user.

The Ninth Circuit's decision also addressed fair use. Although the server test concerned direct infringement of the display right, the court separately held that Google's use of thumbnail images in image search was likely a fair use because the use was transformative.

== Operation of the test ==
The server test asks whether the defendant has stored a copy of the copyrighted work and communicated that copy to the public. If the defendant stores the file on its own server and transmits it to users, the defendant may be directly displaying the work. If the defendant merely embeds or in-line links to a file stored on a third-party server, courts applying the test generally treat the third-party host, rather than the embedding website, as the entity that transmits the copy.

The test can affect claims for direct infringement of the public display right. It does not necessarily resolve other copyright issues, including claims based on reproduction, distribution, contributory infringement, vicarious infringement, Digital Millennium Copyright Act claims, contractual rights, technological circumvention or fair use.

Supporters of the test argue that it provides a clear rule for ordinary internet linking and avoids imposing direct copyright liability on websites that do not possess or control the underlying file. Critics argue that the test gives too much weight to server location and too little weight to the user's experience, because embedded content may appear to the public as part of the embedding website.

== Application to embedded content ==
The server test has been invoked in cases involving embedded social-media posts, online news articles, image search and other forms of web display. In many embedding disputes, a publisher includes code from a third-party platform such as Instagram, Twitter or another website. The embedded content then appears on the publisher's page, while the underlying image or video remains hosted by the third-party platform.

In Hunley v. Instagram, LLC, photographers sued Instagram over third-party websites' embedding of Instagram posts that contained their photographs. The Ninth Circuit reaffirmed the server test and held that Perfect 10 was not limited to search engines. The court concluded that, under Ninth Circuit law, third-party websites that embedded Instagram posts did not directly infringe the photographers' display rights because the websites did not store copies of the underlying images.

The Ninth Circuit also held that Instagram could not be secondarily liable for copyright infringement based on the embedding conduct because secondary liability requires an underlying act of direct infringement. Since the embedding websites were not direct infringers under the server test, the secondary-liability claim against Instagram failed.

== Judicial disagreement ==
Courts outside the Ninth Circuit have not uniformly adopted the server test. In Goldman v. Breitbart News Network, LLC, the United States District Court for the Southern District of New York rejected the server-test defense at the summary-judgment stage. The case involved news websites that embedded tweets containing a copyrighted photograph of Tom Brady. The court held that the defendants could violate the photographer's public display right even though they did not store the image on their own servers.

The Goldman ruling attracted attention from media and technology commentators because it challenged the Ninth Circuit's approach and created uncertainty for online publishers that rely on embedded social-media content.

In Nicklen v. Sinclair Broadcast Group, Inc., the Southern District of New York again questioned the server test in a case involving an embedded video. Judge Jed S. Rakoff rejected the test, agreeing with the argument that it was inconsistent with the Copyright Act's definition of "display".

In McGucken v. Newsweek, LLC, another Southern District of New York case, the court declined to apply the server test in a dispute over an embedded Instagram photograph. The court stated that the Copyright Act casts a broad net in defining display and reasoned that the server test could reduce the display right for photographers who post work online.

== Scholarly commentary ==
Legal scholars have debated whether the server test is consistent with the statutory text and with the structure of the internet. Some commentary defends the test as a practical rule that protects ordinary linking, search engines and embedding technologies from broad direct-infringement liability. Other commentary argues that the test is outdated or too formalistic because it treats server location as dispositive even when the embedding website causes the work to appear to users as part of its own page.

Scholars have also proposed alternatives to the server test. Some proposals focus on the user's perception of whether the work is being displayed by the embedding site. Others focus on volitional conduct, asking whether the defendant took the legally significant action that caused the display. Another proposed approach is to treat embedding as potentially within the display right but to rely on defenses such as fair use, implied license or the absence of required knowledge or intent in particular cases.

The debate often reflects a tension between copyright owners' control over online display and the technical architecture of the web, where websites commonly use links, embeds, scripts and remote-hosted files to assemble pages seen by users.

== Fifth Circuit decision ==
In Emmerich Newspapers, Inc. v. Particle Media, Inc., Emmerich Newspapers sued Particle Media, the operator of the NewsBreak app, over its use of articles from Emmerich newspapers. The litigation concerned NewsBreak's display of articles through framed links and whether article URLs could constitute copyright management information under the Digital Millennium Copyright Act. A district court in Mississippi applied the server test and held that Particle did not infringe Emmerich's display right because Particle did not store copies of the framed articles on its servers.

On August 27, 2026, the United States Court of Appeals for the Fifth Circuit rejected the server test as the proper standard under the Copyright Act. The court described the test as resting on "weak statutory footing" because it focuses on where a work is fixed rather than whether the defendant transmitted a copy of the work. The Fifth Circuit instead held that the public-display inquiry should focus on who transmitted the copy shown to the user.

Applying that approach, the court concluded that Particle's framed linking did not infringe Emmerich's display right. It reasoned that Emmerich's servers transmitted the articles to users, while NewsBreak transmitted requests for the content rather than copies of the articles. The court noted that its transmission-based approach would likely produce results similar to the server test in many circumstances.

The court also held that URLs are not categorically excluded from qualifying as copyright management information, although whether a particular URL qualifies requires a fact-specific inquiry. It remanded the case for further proceedings without deciding the ultimate resolution of Emmerich's claims.

== Practical effect ==
The server test has practical importance for online publishers, social-media platforms, search engines and copyright owners. A broad application of the test reduces direct copyright liability for websites that embed or in-line link to remotely hosted content. Rejection of the server test does not necessarily make embedding an infringement. The Fifth Circuit's transmission-based approach rejected server location as the controlling consideration but still found no display-right infringement where the copyright owner's server transmitted the work and the embedding service transmitted only the request for it.

The test has also affected platform design and licensing practices. Publishers may choose to embed content because embedding avoids hosting a separate copy. Copyright owners may respond by using platform controls, technological restrictions, licensing terms or takedown notices. Courts that reject the server test may place more emphasis on whether the defendant caused the work to be shown to the public, regardless of where the file was stored.

== See also ==
- Copyright aspects of hyperlinking and framing
- Perfect 10, Inc. v. Amazon.com, Inc.
- Copyright infringement
- Fair use
- Hotlinking
- Hyperlink
