= Link exchange =

Confederation of websites that operates similarly to a web ring

A link exchange is a confederation of websites that operates similarly to a web ring. Webmasters register their websites with a central organization, that runs the exchange, and in turn receive from the exchange HTML code which they insert into their web pages. In contrast to a web ring, where the HTML code simply comprises simple circular ring navigation hyperlinks, in a link exchange the HTML code causes the display of banner advertisements, for the sites of other members of the exchange, on the member web sites, and webmasters have to create such banner advertisements for their own web sites.

The banners are downloaded from the exchange. A monitor on the exchange determines, from referral information supplied by web browsers, how many times a member website has displayed the banner advertisements of other members and credits that member with a number of displays of its banner on some other member's web site. Link exchanges usually operate on a 2:1 ratio, such that for every two times a member shows a second member's banner advertisement, that second member displays the first member's banner advertisement. This page impressions:credits ratio is the exchange rate.

One of the earliest link exchanges was LinkExchange, a company that is now owned by Microsoft.

Link exchanges have advantages and disadvantages from the point of view of those using the World Wide Web for marketing. On the one hand, they have the advantages of bringing in a highly targeted readership (for link exchanges where all members of the exchange have similar websites), of increasing the "link popularity" of a site with Web search engines, and of being relatively stable methods of hyperlinking. On the other hand, they have the disadvantages of potentially distracting visitors away to other sites before they have fully explored the site that the original link was on.

Engaging in link exchanges or paid linking activity is highly discouraged by Google and not recommended for webmasters seeking an advantage in search engine rankings. Google considers excessive link exchanges and exchanging reciprocal links "Link Schemes" and can suppress the linked site in search engine results or block it altogether.

== See also ==
- Link building
- Backlink
