= List of newspapers in Mississippi =

Daily and nondaily newspapers in Mississippi

This is a list of newspapers in Mississippi.

== Daily and weekly newspapers (currently published) ==
Title	Locale	Year est.	Frequency	Publisher/parent company	Notes	Ref.
Biloxi-D'Iberville Press	Biloxi/D'Iberville	200?	Weekly	Bay Newspapers, Inc	OCLC 191850671	
Brookhaven Daily Leader	Brookhaven	1968	Daily	Carpenter Media Group	OCLC Preceding	
Canton News	Canton		Monthly	Clay Mansell		
Clarion-Ledger	Jackson/statewide	1941	Daily	USA Today Co.	OCLC 8674244	
Clarksdale Press Register	Clarksdale	1949	Weekly	Emmerich Newspapers	OCLC 15003806	
The Clinton Courier	Clinton		Bi-monthly	Clay Mansell		
Columbian-Progress	Columbia	1935	Bi-weekly	Emmerich Newspapers		
Columbus Commercial	Columbus	1893-1922	Daily	J.T. Senter	OCLC 15049956	
The Commercial Dispatch	Columbus		Daily			
Crystal Springs Meteor	Crystal Springs	1886-1889	Weekly	Hurt & Branch	OCLC 15078789	
Daily Corinthian	Corinth		Daily			
Daily Leader	Brookhaven		Daily			
Daily Star	Grenada		Daily			
Daily Times Leader	West Point		Daily			
Darkhorse Press	Mississippi		Daily			
Deer Creek Pilot	Rolling Fork		Weekly			
Delta Democrat-Times	Greenville		Weekly	Emmerich Newspapers		
Enterprise-Journal	McComb		Bi-weekly	Emmerich Newspapers		
Enterprise-Tocsin	Indianola, Mississippi		Weekly	Emmerich Newspapers		
Florence News	Florence	2018	Monthly	Clay Mansell		
Greenwood Commonwealth	Greenwood		Bi-weekly			
Hattiesburg American	Hattiesburg		Daily	USA Today Co.		
Jackson Advocate	Jackson		Weekly			
Jackson Free Press	Jackson				Changed to magazine 2018	
Laurel Leader-Call	Laurel		Daily			
Lawrence County Press	Monticello		Weekly			
Leland Progress	Leland	1888	Weekly		Closed in July 2024, but revived a few weeks later.	
Long Beach Breeze	Long Beach		Monthly	Clay Mansell		
Madison County Journal	Ridgeland		Weekly			
Meridian Star	Meridian		Bi-weekly	Carpenter Media Group		
Mississippi Business Journal	Jackson/statewide		Daily			
Mississippi Press	Pascagoula		Daily			
Natchez Democrat	Natchez		Daily			
Neshoba Democrat	Philadelphia		Daily			
Newton County Appeal	Union		Weekly	Emmerich Newspapers		
New Albany Gazette	New Albany		Semi-weekly			
Northeast Mississippi Daily Journal	Tupelo		Daily			
The Northside Sun	Jackson		Weekly	Emmerich Newspapers		
Ocean Springs Record	Ocean Springs		Weekly			
Oxford Eagle	Oxford		Weekly			
Pass Christian Gazebo Gazette	Pass Christian		Weekly			
Pearl News	Pearl	2018	Monthly	Clay Mansell		
Pelahatchie News	Pelahatchie		Monthly	Clay Mansell		
Penny Pincher	Gulfport		Weekly			
Picayune Item	Picayune	1904	Weekly Carpenter Media Group	Editorial services shared with Bogalusa Daily News (LA)		
Richland News	Richland	2018	Monthly	Clay Mansell		
Sea Coast Echo	Bay St. Louis		Semi-weekly			
Southwest Rankin News	Pearl, Richland, & Florence, MS		Monthly	Clay Mansell		
Starkville Daily News	Starkville		Daily			
Stone County Enterprise	Wiggins		Weekly			
Sun Herald	Biloxi-Gulfport		Daily	McClatchy Company		
Vicksburg Post	Vicksburg		Tri-weekly	Boone Newspapers		
Wesson News	Wesson	2013	Monthly	Clay Mansell		
Woodville Republican	Woodville	1823	Weekly	Andy Lewis	The oldest newspaper in Mississippi	

== University newspapers ==
- The Black Sheep - student newspaper of the University of Mississippi
- The Daily Mississippian – student newspaper of the University of Mississippi
- The Mississippi Collegian - student newspaper of Mississippi Christian University
- The Reflector – student newspaper of Mississippi State University
- The Spectator - student newspaper of Mississippi University for Women
- The Student Printz - student newspaper of The University of Southern Mississippi

== Defunct ==
- Capitol Reporter
- Jasper County News (1891-2024)
- Smith County Reformer (1897-2024)
- Vicksburg Citizens' Appeal (1964 to 1967)
- The Cleveland News Leader (2004 to 2009; weekly newspaper in Cleveland, Mississippi)

== See also ==
- List of radio stations in Mississippi
- List of television stations in Mississippi
- Category:Journalists from Mississippi

== Bibliography ==
- I. Patridge (1860). "Press of Mississippi: Historical Sketch". De Bow's Review. 29. hdl:2027/njp.32101065217190.
- S. N. D. North; United States Department of the Interior (1884). "Catalogue of Periodical Publications: Mississippi". History and Present Condition of the Newspaper and Periodical Press of the United States. Washington, D.C.: Government Printing Office. OCLC 1850475.
- Proceedings of the Mississippi Press Association, 1885 (1866-1884)
- James T. Haley, ed. (1895), "Newspapers: Mississippi", Afro-American Encyclopaedia, Mind and matter, Nashville: Haley & Florida, hdl:2027/inu.30000029292855, OCLC 219597043
- Thomas McAdory Owen (1900), "Bibliography of Mississippi", Report of the American Historical Association for 1899, p. 777, hdl:2027/mdp.39015039328946 – via HathiTrust, "Newspaper Press"
- "Mississippi". American Newspaper Directory. New York: George P. Rowell. 1900. pp. 524+. hdl:2027/umn.31951002273861a – via HathiTrust.
- Dunbar Rowland, ed. (1907), "Newspapers", Encyclopedia of Mississippi History, vol. 2, Madison, Wisconsin: S. A. Brant, p. 333, hdl:2027/nyp.33433081846465
- "Mississippi". American Newspaper Annual & Directory. Philadelphia: N. W. Ayer & Son. 1922. pp. 511+. hdl:2027/umn.31951001295695n.
- Works Progress Administration (1942). Mississippi newspapers, 1805-1940: a preliminary union list of Mississippi newspaper files available in county archives, offices of publishers, libraries, and private collections in Mississippi. The Mississippi Historical records survey – via HathiTrust.
- Thomas D. Clark (1948). Southern Country Editor. Bobbs-Merrill. OCLC 525858. (Includes information about weekly rural newspapers in Mississippi)
- Julius Eric Thompson (1993), The Black Press in Mississippi, 1865-1985, Gainesville: University Press of Florida, ISBN 0813011744
- "Mississippi Newspapers". Library of Congress.
