= Intellectual Reserve, Inc. v. Utah Lighthouse Ministry, Inc. =

Legal case

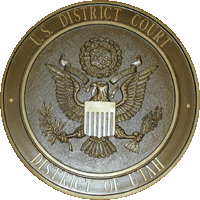
- Court: United States District Court for the District of Utah
- Full case name: Intellectual Reserve, Inc. v. Utah Lighthouse Ministry, Inc., Jerald Tanner, Sandra Tanner, et al., U.S. District Court, Utah
- Decided: November 30, 2000
- Docket nos.: 2:99-cv-808C
- Citation: 75 F. Supp. 2d 1290

Court membership
- Judge sitting: Tena Campbell

Intellectual Reserve, Inc. v. Utah Lighthouse Ministry, Inc., 75 F. Supp. 2d 1290 (D. Utah 1999), was a United States district court decision on the subject of deep linking and contributory infringement of copyright.

== Background ==
The plaintiff, Intellectual Reserve, Inc., is a Salt Lake City, Utah–based corporation that owns the copyright and has the rights to other intellectual property assets used by The Church of Jesus Christ of Latter-day Saints.

The defendants, on the other hand, Utah Lighthouse Ministries, Inc., operate a web site and publishes material critical of the Church.

The LDS Church had printed a work of text called the Church Handbook of Instructions: Book 1, Stake Presidencies and Bishoprics. This work had not been published, and had been prepared only for use within the church. The defendants had obtained a copy of the work and published parts of it on their website without reproducing the Intellectual Reserve, Inc. copyright notice. The copyrighted text had also been disseminated to other websites who had published the material, to which the defendants' website linked.

== Arguments ==
The plaintiffs moved for a preliminary injunction and argued that:

- they had a valid copyright to the material that the defendants had posted on their website,
- that they were likely to establish at trial that those who had posted the material on the three websites had infringed the plaintiff's copyright,
- that anyone who browsed the three websites was infringing the plaintiff's copyright by making a copy of the material and
- that the defendants actively encouraged the infringement of the plaintiff's copyright.

The plaintiffs also argued that

- they had demonstrated a likelihood of success and that there was a presumption of injury, and
- the plaintiffs would suffer "immediate and real irreparable harm" if the defendants were "permitted to post the copyrighted material or to knowingly induce, cause or materially contribute to the infringement of plaintiff's copyright by others".

== Court finding ==
The court originally granted a preliminary injunction for the plaintiff and ordered the defendant to remove from the website the material that allegedly infringed plaintiff's copyright, and to refrain from reproducing or distributing verbatim in a tangible medium any material that allegedly infringed the copyright.

The court then issued a permanent injunction that "dissolved and vacated" the preliminary injunction, replacing it with an injunction based on a settlement between the parties. In this injunction, the court forbade Utah Lighthouse Ministry from posting on the Internet, displaying, or reproducing the Church Handbook of Instructions. Lighthouse Ministry was further prohibited from posting on the Internet the URLs of any websites that hosted any materials from the Church Handbook of Instructions.

== Impact ==
=== Preliminary impact ===
The defendants did not raise the issue of the doctrine of fair use in their defense. The case did not affect situations where the material being linked to is posted by the copyright holder or with the permission of the copyright holder. This case did not raise the issue of transitivity, i.e. it is irrelevant whether the site that is being linked to contains any other questionable publications or links not related directly to the referenced material. If the transitivity was assured, virtually no single website would be eligible for linking, as the copyright infringement can occur in user comments or user links. The preliminary finding was, as long as a link leads to a material legally published, the link should be considered valid.

=== Permanent impact ===
The permanent injunction "dissolved and vacated" the preliminary injunction's and temporary restraining order's legal effects on the defendants. However, the court's order remains valid case law, and it has been cited by a few other courts. (Note: See, for example, CoStar Realty Info., Inc. v. Field, 737 F. Supp. 2d 496, 507 (D. Md. 2010))

== See also ==
- Copyright law
  - Copyright infringement
  - Contributory copyright infringement
- US court cases:
  - A & M Records, Inc. v. Napster, Inc. (2000)
  - Online Policy Group v. Diebold, Inc. (2004)
  - Ticketmaster v. Tickets.com (2000)
- World Wide Web linking:
  - Deep linking
  - Inline linking
