= Inbound =

Inbound may refer to:

- Inbound link or backlink, an incoming link to a website.
- Inbound, a term for buses and trains travelling toward a city center
  - (of the greater San Francisco Bay Area) towards or through downtown San Francisco, regardless of origin
- Inbound - a rock band based out of Cranberry Township, Butler County, Pennsylvania.
- Inbound pass, a throw-in used in basketball to restart play after a score or non-shooting foul
