= Newsbreak (disambiguation) =

Newsbreak is a newsworthy event.

Newsbreak may also refer to:

- Rappler's Newsbreak (magazine), Filipino news publication
- SNL NewsBreak, the name of Saturday Night Live's Weekend Update segment from 1981 to 1982
- Nine's Newsbreak, the name of Nine News's News Update title
- NewsBreak, a local news aggregator owned by Particle Media
