= Equilateral (disambiguation) =

An equilateral triangle is a triangle that has three equal sides and angles.

Equilateral may also refer to:

- Equilateral polygon, in geometry
- Equilateral dimension of a metric space, in mathematics
- Equilateral triathlon, in which each leg would take an approximately equal time

== See also ==
- Venus Equilateral, a set of 13 science fiction short stories by George O. Smith
