= Meter (disambiguation) =

Meter or metre is a unit of measurement of length in the metric system.

Meter or metre may also refer to:

- Meter, a measuring instrument
  - Utility meter (disambiguation), such as gas, electricity, etc
  - Parking meter
- Meter or Cybele, an Anatolian-Aegean mother goddess
- Metrae or Metre, an ancient city and bishopric now Çatalca district in European Istanbul

== Entertainment ==
- Metre (hymn), the syllable patterns in hymn stanzas
- Metre (music), the regular underlying temporal grid of music
- Metre (poetry), the regular linguistic sound patterns of a verse
- The Meters, a funk band based in New Orleans, Louisiana from the late 1960s until 1977
  - The Meters (album)
- Meter (film), a 2023 Indian Telugu-language film

== See also ==
- Metric (disambiguation)
- Metric dimension (disambiguation)
- Category:Measuring instruments
