= Fatrasie =

French poetry genre

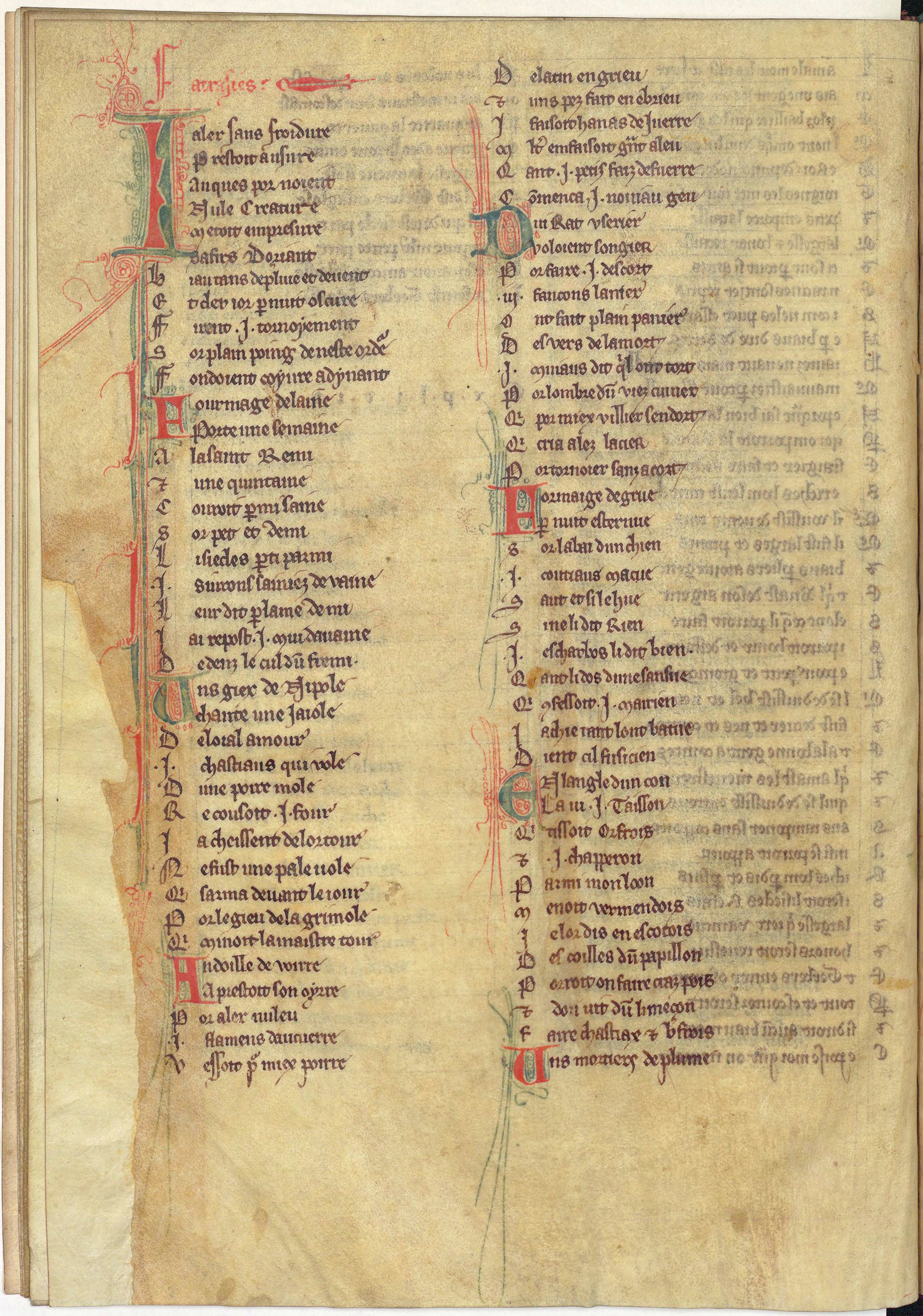
13th-century manuscript of fatrasies

Fatrasie is a Medieval French poetic genre that emerged in the 13th century in the Artois and Picardy regions of France. Only two examples survive to the modern period: eleven poems that constitute les Fatrasies de Philippe de Beaumanoir composed by the trouvère Philippe de Rémi and fifty-five poems titled les Fatrasies d'Arras. The genre died out with the close of the 16th century and only became an area of renewed study with the Surrealist movement's championing of the genre and academic research beginning in the 1960s.

== Definition ==
A fatrasie is a poem in which the sense takes secondary importance to sound, structured in particular using a system of the repetition of syllables. This accumulation of phrases and resonances of sound sometimes contains satirical critiques of political figures. It has been suggested that the origins of the metrical and stylistic contraints of the genre lies in deliberate parody of medieval Latin hymns. The genre also shares much with broader currents of the medieval Grotesque, leading André Malraux to write that 'The audience of the medieval fatrasie was no less than that of Hieronymus Bosch'.

Fatrasies are characterised by a fixed form: this form contains eleven verses whose first six lines have five syllables and whose last five lines have seven. The form is written entirely based on two rhymes, according to a strict scheme of aabaabbaba.

== Examples ==
Below is an example in Old French drawn from the Fatrasies d'Arras:

Uns biaus hom sans teste
Menoit molt grant feste
Por mangier cailliaus.
Molt est fiere beste
Cil qui l'en arreste
Un Jeudy a Miaus,
Et quatre asnesses sanz piax
Demenoient molt grant feste
Por aus tolir lor drapiaus.
Illueques chantoit de geste
Une cuve en deus tonniaus.

In modern French, it reads:

Bel homme sans tête
Pour faire la fête
Mangeait des cailloux,
Mais bête sauvage
Est qui l'en empêche
Un jeudi à Maux,
Et quatre ânesses sans peau
Prenaient un très grand plaisir
À dérober leurs habits.
Une cuve en deux tonneaux
Chantaient des chansons de geste.

As translated by Ted Byrne and Donato Mancini, the poem reads:

A handsome headless man
laid on a great feast
just to eat pebbles
It took a proud beast
to call off this show
one Thursday at Méaux
Four skinless donkeys
had the time of their lives
peeling off all their clothes
so a tub on two barrels
could sing songs of their deeds.

An additional example of a poem similar to a fatrasie can be found in La Farce de maître Pathelin, in which a character sings a macaronic song whose form resembles the Old French genre.
