= Ticketmaster Corp. v. Tickets.com, Inc. =

Ticketmaster Corp., et al. v. Tickets.Com, Inc.
- Court: United States District Court for the Central District of California
- Full case name: Case No. 99-CV-07654

Court membership
- Judge sitting: Harry Lindley Hupp

Ticketmaster Corp., et al. v. Tickets.Com, Inc. was a 2000 case by the United States District Court for the Central District of California finding that deep linking did not violate the Copyright Act of 1976 because it did not involve direct copying. The decision permitted Tickets.com to place deep links to Ticketmaster.

Deep linking, hyperlinking to another website's interior pages, was the subject of considerable controversy in the late 1990s and early 2000s because it allowed consumers to bypass a website's advertising-rich homepage. This could lead to significant financial losses in advertising revenue based on page impressions. In early 1997, Ticketmaster filed a lawsuit against Microsoft for unauthorized deep linking to Ticketmaster in its Sidewalk.com website. In February 1999, the case was settled out of court in a non-disclosure agreement that led to Microsoft no longer having deep links to Ticketmaster. In July 1999, Ticketmaster filed a lawsuit against Tickets.com with ten causes of action, including charges that Tickets.com had violated federal copyright laws and violated Ticketmaster's terms and conditions.

In March 2000, ruling on Tickets.com's motion to dismiss U.S. District Judge Harry Lindley Hupp found that deep linking was not prohibited by the Copyright Act because no direct copying had occurred. In August 2000, Hupp denied Ticketmaster's motion for a preliminary injunction against Tickets.com's linking and web crawling. For linking, he wrote that uniform resource locators (URLs) were not copyrightable because they contained only factual and function features, and for web crawling, he wrote that it passed legal muster under the fair use doctrine and did not pose an undue burden on Ticketmaster's servers. The United States Court of Appeals for the Ninth Circuit affirmed in a one-paragraph unpublished opinion.

== Context ==
There are two forms of linking: surface linking (which delivers the consumer to the linked website's homepage) and deep linking (which delivers the consumer to a non-homepage link of the website). Websites usually do not object to surface linking because it contributes to a growth in traffic and popularity, which leads to a monetary gain for advertising. Deep linking, on the other hand, has been a magnet for debate because it circumvents the advertising-rich homepage and may lead to lost revenue.

=== Ticketmaster v. Microsoft ===
Ticketmaster and Microsoft attempted to forge an agreement to allow Microsoft to have deep links to Ticketmaster. After the talks reached a stalemate and without permission from Ticketmaster, Microsoft used the deep links on its Sidewalk.com website, a Seattle city guide that provided details about future events in the area. Ticketmaster responded by banning incoming requests from the Microsoft links, and Microsoft countered the block by providing links to search engine queries that linked to Ticketmaster pages.

In early 1997, Ticketmaster sued Microsoft because its Sidewalk.com website was linking to pages on Ticketmaster about particular events. The lawsuit, Ashley Dunn wrote in The New York Times, "sent a shiver of anxiety through the online world since it struck at one of the most basic aspects of the Web – the freedom and openness of the hypertext link". Calling Microsoft's deep linking "electronic piracy", Ticketmaster argued that the practice circumvented Ticketmaster's homepage, which had paid advertisements, and led to fewer homepage visits. This could negatively impact Ticketmaster's page impressions-based advertising income. Ticketmaster further asserted that it had contracts permitting other websites to deep link to Ticketmaster; Microsoft's unauthorized deep linking therefore rendered the contracts effectively valueless. In February 1999, Ticketmaster settled the deep linking lawsuit against Microsoft after Microsoft complied with the request to cease the linking. The details of the settlement were subjected to a non-disclosure agreement. After their settlement, Yahoo! and Knight-Ridder signed contracts with Ticketmaster and were given leave to make deep links to Ticketmaster. The New York Times's Bob Tedeschi noted in August 1997 that the Ticketmaster–Microsoft deep-linking case was "closely watched by legal experts because no court has yet ruled on whether deep linking is legal".

=== Background ===
The legality of deep linking was the center of a fractious dispute among electronic commerce businesses. To compete for customers' consideration, a number of websites included hyperlinks to their competitors' pages, bringing users to inner pages of their opponents' websites. This practice circumvents the opponents' home page, which contains money-generating advertisements. In 2000, Ticketmaster had signed numerous "exclusive arguments" with a large number of the major athletic and amusement organizations. The ticket business began shifting to the internet, leading to competition between Ticketmaster and Tickets.com. Tickets.com allowed consumers to purchase tickets at their website. They had links to ticket-selling websites like Ticketmaster and Ticketweb to allow consumers to purchase tickets not sold on Tickets.com. Tickets.com included the statement "These tickets are sold by another ticketing company" before each link to a different ticket-selling website. Whereas Tickets.com generates revenue through web advertisements, Ticketmaster received money through Internet ticket selling and advertisements founded upon how many visitors accessed its homepage. Tickets.com employed a web crawler to systematically comb Ticketmaster's webpages and retrieve event details and uniform resource locators (URLs). After obtaining the facts, the web crawlers would destroy in 15 seconds the webpage copies but retain the URLs. The lawsuit, scholars Teresa Scassa and Michael Eugene Deturbide wrote, were motivated by how Ticket.com was becoming the "choice portal" for consumers buying tickets on the web by taking advantage of Ticketmaster's content.

== Legal proceedings ==
On July 23, 1999, Ticketmaster Online-CitySearch, a subsidiary of Pasadena-based Ticketmaster filed a lawsuit in the U.S. District Court for the Central District of California against Tickets.com in an attempt to block Tickets.com from disapproved deep linking to Ticketmaster, asserting that the practice caused them monetary losses on their homepage advertising. In the lawsuit, Ticketmaster alleged that Tickets.com had engaged in unlawful business choices. The litany of ten causes of action included charges that Tickets.com had breached federal copyright laws and engaged in false advertising, tortious interference, reverse passing off, unfair competition, and unfair business practices. It also said that Tickets.com violated the website's terms and conditions, which disallowed users from using Ticketmaster for monetary gain or unsanctioned deep linking. Ticketmaster charged in the complaint that when providing Ticketmaster phone numbers on Ticket.com, Ticket.com frequently gave invalid numbers—one time a phone sex number was listed—or the numbers of Ticketmaster's competitors.

TicketsMaster lawyer commented, "If we spend substantial money to build up a site, why should they be able to take that and build their business on the backs of our hard work?" Tickets.com's lawyer countered that deep linking is natural in a public Internet, "They have an open site and are a member of the free Internet community. They have to live by the rules of that community as it has grown up."

=== Ruling on motion to dismiss ===
On March 27, 2000, U.S. District Judge Harry Lindley Hupp ruled on Tickets.com's motion to dismiss. He said that "deep linking by itself (i.e., without confusion of source)" does not necessarily involve unfair competition" under the following conditions: One, there is no confusion as to which website a consumer is accessing, and two, no pages are being duplicated by other websites. He said that "Hyperlinking does not itself involve a violation of the Copyright Act. There is no deception in what is happening. This is analogous to using a library's card index to get reference to particular items, albeit faster and more efficiently." Just as the library's card index enabled users to locate copyrighted books, the hyperlinks enabled users to locate copyrighted webpages.

The judge further ruled that Tickets.com was not legally obligated to abide by Ticketmaster's terms and conditions because they were not "open and obvious and in fact hard to miss". The terms and conditions were located at the homepage's bottom and viewers did not have to assent to them to access the website. Regarding the trespass to chattels claim, his decision noted that "it is hard to see how entering a publicly available Web site could be called a trespass, since all are invited to enter". Furthermore, Ticket.com's combing of Ticketmaster's databases was a trivial percentage of Ticketmaster's overall traffic, leading to an insignificant effect on the website's response time. Hupp found that possible negative effects of deep linking (the diminished advertising revenue) were equally matched by possible positive effects (the increased ticket sales from the referral of users wishing to purchase tickets from Tickets.com to Ticketmaster).

=== Ruling on motion for a preliminary injunction ===
On August 10, 2000, Hupp issued a decision on Ticketmaster's motion for a preliminary injunction against linking and spidering. He ruled that the copyright violation claim was unfounded because "purely factual information", such as a public event's date, location, and cost, could not be copyrighted, regardless of the cost of time needed to aggregate the facts. He found that "the manner of expression and format of presenting those facts is protectable", and Tickets.com ensured to use their own expression and format to present the facts. Basing his reasoning on Sony Computer Entertainment, Inc. v. Connectix Corp., Hupp wrote that Ticket.com's short-lived copies of Ticketmaster's webpages, which were used to obtain facts, was legal under the fair use doctrine of United States copyright law. He called the duplication a type of "reverse engineering to obtain non-protectable information". It passed legal muster under Sony Computer Entertainment because it was immediately removed after having served its purpose to retrieve non-copyrightable facts and was the ablest, albeit not sole, method to do so. He also found that URLs were not copyrightable because they consisted of "functional and factual elements".

In July 2001, Tickets.com ceased deep linking to Ticketmaster, instead focusing on its own ticket offerings. In their 2012 book Ticket Masters: The Rise of the Concert Industry and How the Public Got Scalped, Dean Budnick and Josh Baron reported that "the court refused to grant a preliminary injunction on the copyright issue, and although the lawsuit lingered for a few years, Ticketmaster never received a definitive judicial pronouncement in its favor".

In a one-paragraph unpublished opinion, the United States Court of Appeals for the Ninth Circuit upheld Hupp's decision.

== Commentary ==
Approving of the ruling, Tickets.com's lawyer Danniel Harris said, "It is significant, not so much for the dismissals, but in the time and care put into the underlying issues". Author-attorney Jacqueline Klosek wrote that the Ticketmaster case provided strong evidence for how websites should avoid placing a link to their terms and conditions page at the bottom of the homepage if they wanted the terms and conditions to pass legal muster. She recommended that websites use a clickwrap agreement and if that proved problematic, websites ought to place a link to the terms and conditions page at a prominent location. The Register's Thomas C. Greene speculated that the lawsuit was filed because there was no law mandating that consumers must view their advertisements. He said that "perhaps an Act of Congress is in order to rectify this glaring omission in the American legal system".

After the March 2000 ruling, Journalism.co.uk's Caroline White called the ruling a "seminal case over deep linking". The Register's Drew Cullen said it was a "definitive case...establishing the legality of deep linking in the US". Lawyer Margaret Smith Kubiszyn disputed the media's general conclusion that the deep linking debate was settled:

Although the news reports on the Ticketmaster v. Tickets.com case have enthusiastically proclaimed that the controversy is over, that deep linking is okay, Judge Hupp's ruling hardly lays forth a road map telling us when we can, and, more importantly, when we cannot, deep link. Clearly, Judge Hupp leaves open the possibility for a claim of copyright infringement and unfair competition in cases where the user could be confused as to the source of content or be oblivious to the fact that he had been linked into the interior of another site.

The New York Times's Carl S. Kaplan agreed with Kubiszyn, quoting Jessica R. Friedman, who said that "the law on linking is still in a gray area".
