= Emmerich Newspapers =

American newspaper publisher

- Company type: Private
- Industry: Newspapers
- Headquarters: Jackson, Mississippi, United States

Emmerich Newspapers is a privately held American publisher of community newspapers based in Jackson, Mississippi. The company owns 22 newspapers.

== History ==
Members of the Emmerich family have been active in Mississippi journalism since the early twentieth century, notably editor and publisher J. Oliver Emmerich Sr. of the Enterprise-Journal in McComb; the Mississippi Press Association’s annual J. O. Emmerich Award for editorial writing is named in his honor.

One Emmerich-owned weekly, the Rankin Record, ceased publication in 2015.

Beginning in 2021, Emmerich Newspapers pursued copyright claims against Particle Media, Inc., operator of the NewsBreak app, in federal court in Mississippi. The litigation concerned NewsBreak's use of Emmerich articles and raised questions about the "server test", a copyright doctrine involving embedded online content. In July 2025, the United States District Court for the Southern District of Mississippi issued a mixed summary judgment ruling, including rulings on NewsBreak's full-text display of some Emmerich material and on whether Emmerich article URLs constituted copyright management information under the Digital Millennium Copyright Act.

The case was appealed to the United States Court of Appeals for the Fifth Circuit, where Emmerich challenged the district court's application of the server test and its ruling that URLs did not constitute copyright management information. Legal-news outlets described the appeal as significant for websites and applications that embed or display online content without hosting the material on their own servers.

In February 2025, a Mississippi chancery judge ordered the Emmerich-owned Clarksdale Press Register to remove an editorial criticizing city officials, drawing national criticism from press-freedom advocates; the city soon dropped its lawsuit and the judge later vacated the order.

== Publications ==
=== Mississippi ===
- Delta Democrat Times (Greenville)
- The Northside Sun (Jackson)
- Enterprise-Journal (McComb)
- The Greenwood Commonwealth (Greenwood)
- Clarksdale Press Register (Clarksdale)
- The Enterprise-Tocsin (Indianola)
- The Sun-Sentinel (Charleston)
- The Star-Herald (Kosciusko)
- The Yazoo Herald (Yazoo City)
- Scott County Times (Forest)
- Clarke County Tribune (Quitman)
- The Newton County Appeal (Union)
- Winona Times/Carroll Conservative (Winona)
- Red Hills News (Louisville)
- Grenada Star (Grenada)
- Columbian Progress (Columbia)
- Magee Courier-Simpson County News (Magee)
- Pine Belt News (Hattiesburg)

=== Arkansas ===
- The Dumas Clarion (Dumas)

=== Louisiana ===
- The Era-Leader (Franklinton)
- The Madison Journal (Tallulah)
