= Insider Pages =

- Company type: Subsidiary
- Website type: Local search
- Founded: 2004
- Headquarters: San Francisco, California
- Parent: CityGrid Media (eLocal)
- Website: www.insiderpages.com

Insider Pages is an online "local search" service operated by IAC. It was founded by Stuart MacFarlane in 2004.

Before its acquisition by IAC the company was based in Redwood Shores, California, and had over 600,000 reviews of local merchants in the United States. On March 27, 2006, the company announced an $8.5 million investment by Sequoia Capital, Softbank Capital, and Idealab. The company addressed a demographic (by its description) of young and middle-aged families who own homes in urban and suburban areas.

After laying off two-thirds of its staff in January 2007, they were acquired (for an undisclosed amount) by IAC, operators of Citysearch, in March 2007. In November 2007, Insider Pages launched the Insider Pages Fundraiser program to allow groups to write reviews to receive funding.

In 2019, IAC sold its CityGrid Media division, including Insider Pages, to eLocal.
