= Citysearch =

Online city guide

- Company type: Subsidiary
- Website type: Local search
- Founded: 1995 in La Crescenta, California
- Headquarters: West Hollywood, California
- Area served: United States
- Industry: Advertising
- Parent: CityGrid Media (eLocal)
- Website: citysearch.com

Citysearch is an online city guide that provides information about businesses in the categories of dining, entertainment, retail, travel, and professional services in cities throughout the United States. Visitors to each of Citysearch's local city guides will find contact information, maps, driving directions, editorial, and user reviews for the businesses listed. Citysearch is headquartered in West Hollywood, California and is an owned and operated web site of CityGrid Media, which is an operating business of eLocal. The original office was in Pasadena, California.

Citysearch was founded in September 1995 by Jeffrey Brewer, Caskey Dickson, Brad Haaugard, Taylor Wescoatt, and Tamar Halpern. Charles R. Conn was then recruited to lead the new company. The idea, initiative, and seed capital came initially from Bill Gross.

In August 1998, Citysearch merged with Ticketmaster Online. In July 1999, Citysearch acquired the competing Sidewalk.com website from Microsoft, and merged the two sites together. In December 1999, Ticketmaster-CitySearch received a $40 million investment from USA Networks, Inc., then controlled by Barry Diller. In 2007, another competitor, Insider Pages was acquired. In June 2010, Citysearch LLC rebranded as CityGrid Media. The company also operates similar local consumer properties, such as Insider Pages.

In 2019, eLocal acquired CityGrid Media from IAC.

While many local search sites mushroomed in the 21st century, Citysearch faced intense competition from the fast-growing Yelp, Inc. In the late 2000s, Yelp grew at 80% while Citysearch growth remained flat. Local search engines from Bing, Google and Yahoo also became competitors to Citysearch for finding local businesses on the internet.

== Best of Citysearch ==
Best of Citysearch is a feature that gives locals an opportunity to vote for their favorite businesses in popular categories such as Restaurants, Nightlife, Hotels and Services. Citysearch opens up its annual polls with nominations from editors. Throughout the voting period visitors to the site cast votes for their favorite local business. After the polls close, the top ten businesses in each category are revealed to their cities.

== Criticism ==
In 2005, Citysearch was criticized by a blogger for their alleged inflation of user submitted ratings and reviews. Citysearch has since updated their ratings system. Citysearch has also stated that they have the right to refuse to post or to remove any user review that violates the terms of use. Reviews that are subject to removal include unacceptable content such as profanity, personal information, promotion of illegal activity and harmful content. In November 2007, Citysearch partnered with MerchantCircle, a company that conducts automated telemarketing to small businesses to sell them online advertising packages.
