= Sun Herald =

Newspaper in Biloxi, Mississippi

- Type: Twice-weekly newspaper
- Format: Broadsheet
- Owner: The McClatchy Company
- Founded: 1884 (as Weekly Herald)
- Headquarters: 2505 14th Street, Suite 400; Gulfport, MS 39501; United States
- Circulation: 13,848 daily 15,668 Sunday (as of 2020)
- ISSN: 2688-8955 (print); 2688-8963 (web)
- OCLC number: 12788034
- Website: www.SunHerald.com

The Sun Herald is a U.S. newspaper based in Biloxi, Mississippi, that serves readers along the Mississippi Gulf Coast. The paper's current executive editor and general manager is Blake Kaplan, and its headquarters is in the city of Gulfport. It is owned by The McClatchy Company, one of the largest newspaper publishers in the United States.

== History ==
It was founded in 1884 as The Weekly Herald, based in Biloxi. It expanded its coverage into Gulfport in 1905, and by 1934 had changed its name to The Daily Herald, becoming an evening and Saturday newspaper. The State Record Company bought the paper from its longtime owners, the Wilkes family, in 1968. Around this time, it moved its Saturday edition to morning publication and added a Sunday edition. It added a morning companion paper, the South Mississippi Sun, in 1973. That edition ran until 1985, when the two papers were merged as the Sun Herald, a seven-day all-day paper. The evening edition was dropped in 1986, shortly before State Record merged with Knight Ridder.

The Sun Herald offices and printing presses were squarely hit by Hurricane Katrina in August 2005, but the newspaper never missed an edition. Some of the staff evacuated in advance of the storm to Columbus, Georgia, where then-owner Knight Ridder owned the Ledger-Enquirer. From the Columbus paper's newsroom, the Sun Herald editors and designers, with the help of Knight Ridder journalists from across the country, produced daily editions of the Sun Herald for eleven days, until power could be restored to Biloxi and the newspaper could be produced at its plant there.

The Sun Herald was awarded the 2006 Pulitzer Prize for Public Service, along with The Times-Picayune of New Orleans, for coverage of Hurricane Katrina and its aftermath. It is the first Pulitzer for the newspaper. The same year, Knight Ridder was purchased by McClatchy.

In April 2024, the newspaper announced it would decrease the number of print editions to two a week: Wednesdays and Sundays.

== See also ==
- List of newspapers in Mississippi
