= Vuestar Technologies =

Vuestar Technologies Pte Ltd is a Singapore-incorporated subsidiary owned by Australian parent Goldspirit Investments Pty Ltd. The owner of both companies, Ronald Neville Langford, applied for a number of patents around the world relating to search techniques using hyperlinked images to other websites or web pages.

In May 2008, Vuestar sent invoices to owners of several Singaporean websites demanding licensing fees if the websites wished to continue using “visual images” to link to other web pages. A Singapore law firm advised people to carefully analyse the wide claims being made by Vuestar as to the intellectual property covered by their patent.

== Company claims ==
Vuestar's website states that it has obtained granted patents for "a method of locating web-sites using visual images" in Singapore, Australia, New Zealand and the United States. It says that website owners who "use visual images which hyperlink to other web-pages or web-sites in accordance with the patent ... whether on the first page or subsequent pages of a web-site" require a license from them to continue doing so legally. User licenses are issued for one year and restricted to Singapore. Annual licensing fees depend on web traffic as well as the extent of image hyperlinking and range from nothing for governments, charities and non commercial enterprises to "millions".

In May 2008, in a move which has sparked criticism among online communities, Vuestar sent invoices to owners of several Singaporean websites demanding licensing fees if the websites wished to continue using visual images to link to other web pages. Vuestar has stated that it also intends to enforce its rights in Australia and the United States.

== Response ==
Owners of Arowana community site Arofanatics.com were sent an invoice for S$5,350, but they have said that they do not intend to pay.

The actions of Vuestar have been called patent trolling by some. Ronald Langford, the inventor and a major shareholder of Vuestar Technologies, has stated that "there has been no law broken" and that his company is seeking payment for the use of its technology "because the company has been 'damaged financially to the tune of millions of dollars'"

Eileen Yu, on the ZDNet Asia blog, suggested that Vuestar's patent was the result of a flawed patent-approval system. However, she did also point out that Vuestar's claims might not be true or that they might have misinterpreted their patent. Singapore law firm, Keystone Law, also advised people to carefully analyse Vuestar's wide claims on the intellectual property covered by their patent.

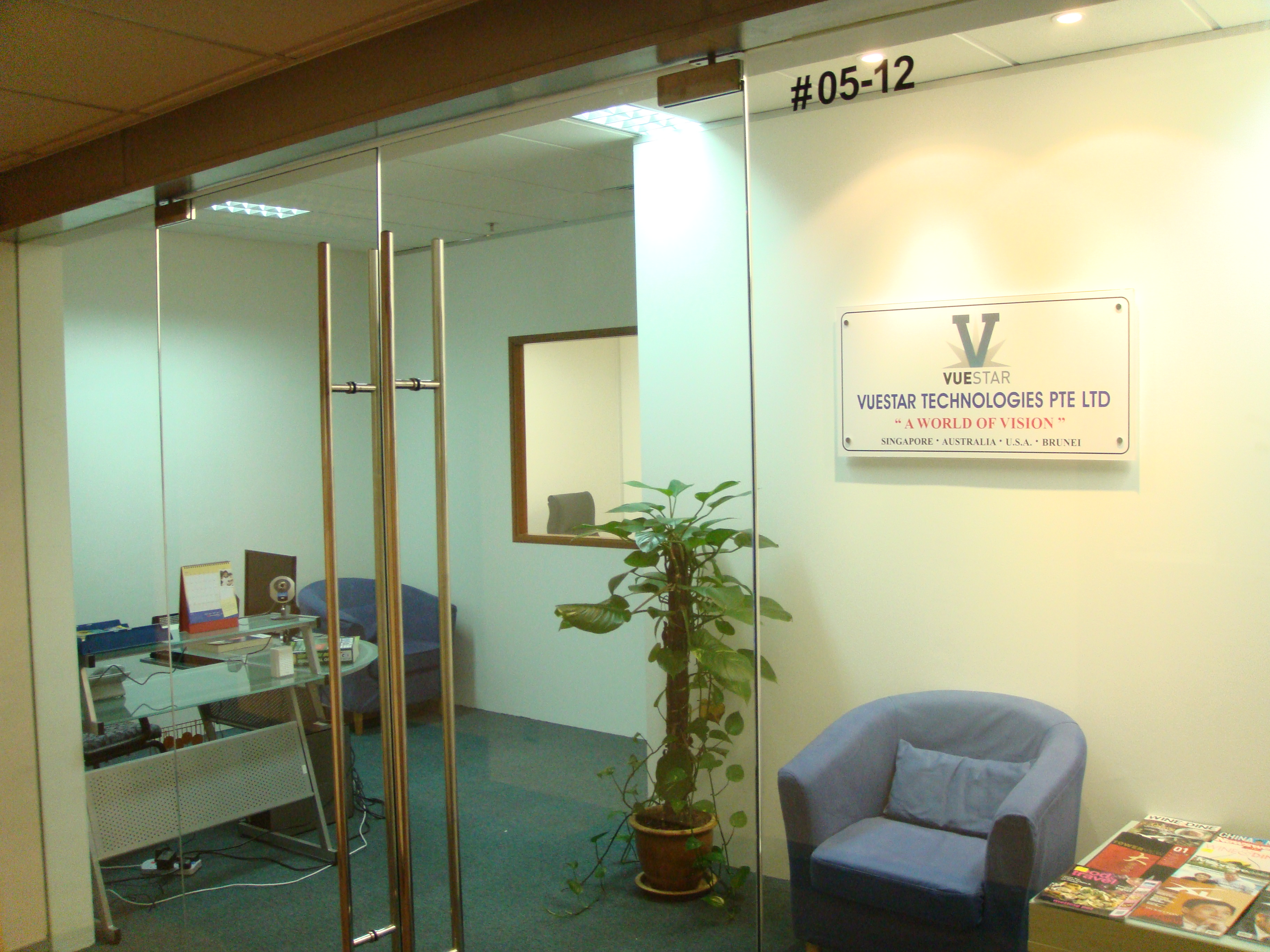
Vuestar's Singapore Headquarters

== Patents ==
The patents owned by the parent company GoldSpirit Investment Pty Ltd and Vuestar Technology Pte Ltd were all registered under the name of inventor Ronald Langford, including US 7065520, AU 755035 and Singaporean patent 95940. The Australian patent has ceased through failure to pay a renewal fee due in October 2007, according to the IPAustralian patent database. EP application 1327207 was also filed but lapsed through failure to pay a renewal fee before the European Patent Office had conducted their own prior art search.

All of these patents originated from WO application 0229623 which was searched and examined by IP Australia who were unable to identify any particularly relevant prior art. The patents in Australia and Singapore were therefore granted without significant limitations to the claims. The US patent was granted only after further examination by the US Patent and Trademark Office resulting in additional limitations being added to all of the independent claims as granted, including that: "the visual content comprises a plurality of mini-images in the form of a conveyor belt slide show". Further US prosecution details are available via the USPTO Public PAIR system.

== See also ==
- Odex's actions against file-sharing
