= Organic linking =

Natural, contextual linking between websites

Organic linking, also known as natural linking, is a marketing strategy that involves creating high-quality content that attracts other websites to link back to it. Unlike paid or manipulative linking, organic links are earned through the value of the content itself. Organic links are more likely to appear in a context relevant to the subject of the target document, which makes them useful for search engines like Google Search that rank pages according to their links. Organic linking can be a powerful tool for improving search engine rankings, increasing brand awareness, and driving organic traffic to a website, because they act as Backlinks, the help prove credibility and reputation. Successful organic linking requires creating unique and informative content, that provides value for others; Estimates vary, but 50-80% of users clicks tend to go through organic links on the first page of a search engine's responses.
