= Sidewalk.com =

The Sidewalk.com website was formerly the location of a Microsoft Corporation local information project. The website is now owned by Ask Media Group.

== History ==
Sidewalk.com was first registered in 1995 by a C.D. Bell of Los Angeles, CA, as a website where local subscribers could gain a presence on the web. Bell compiled a lengthy list of possible names for his new domain, and much to his surprise his first choice, "Sidewalk.com", was available. Most of the website content was rather inconsequential save for the wildly popular "Unofficial O.J. Simpson Boycott Page".

In 1996 Bell sold the domain to the Microsoft Corporation who, for its purposes, was interested in the domain name only.

1997 saw Microsoft debut the website as a listing of local events and information in numerous cities. It was Microsoft Corporation's attempt to create a group of comprehensive web portals oriented towards specific cities. Imbued with hip urban writing and lifestyle articles, the service was intended to compete with urban weekly newspapers. It was preceded by other city-specific net guides such as AOL's Digital Cities and Boulevards.

In 1999, Microsoft sold the project to Citysearch. However, in 2007 Steve Ballmer stated that "Sidewalk was really aimed at what we now call local search... Sidewalk is one we should not have gotten out of."

On June 25, 2009, Citysearch launched the "Right Here Right Now" challenge, inviting participants to create a business at Sidewalk.com. Participants were to submit an idea for a web and mobile application that includes access to Citysearch's taxonomy, directory, content and other open APIs focused on local.

As of October 2012, the site is controlled by Citysearch subsidiary CityGrid Media and contains very limited content.
