= Internal and external links =

Hyperlinks to resources on local or remote domains

An internal link is a type of hyperlink on a web page to another page or resource, such as an image or document, on the same website or domain. It is the opposite of an external link, a link that directs a user to content that is outside its domain.

== Hyperlinks ==
Hyperlinks are considered either "external" or "internal" depending on their target or destination. Generally, a link to a page outside the same domain or website is considered external, whereas one that points at another section of the same web page or to another page of the same website or domain is considered internal. Both internal and external links allow users of the website to navigate to another web page or resource. These definitions become clouded, however, when the same organization operates multiple domains functioning as a single web experience, e.g., when a commerce website secured via HTTPS is used for purchasing things displayed on a non-secure website. In these cases, links that are "external" by the above definition can conceivably be classified as "internal" for some purposes. Ultimately, an internal link points to a web page or resource in the same root directory.

== Internal links ==
Similarly, seemingly "internal" links are in fact "external" for many purposes, for example in the case of linking among subdomains of a main domain, which are not operated by the same person(s). For example, a blogging platform, such as WordPress, Blogger or Tumblr host thousands of different blogs on subdomains, which are entirely unrelated and the authors of which are generally unknown to each other with no control over the links outside their own subdomain or blog. In these contexts one might view a link as "internal" only if it linked within the same blog, not to other blogs within the same domain.

== Usages ==
The existence of internal links are used in websites in order to navigate to multiple pages under a domain, making them a requirement if a website were to have more than one page (unless that page is meant to be inaccessible to the average visitor). Internal links are also commonly used by web crawlers (e.g. for indexing a website for a search engine).

== See also ==
- Backlink – Link from another website (referrer) to that web resource (referent)
- Automatic hyperlinking – Software feature
