= Deep linking =

Website linking style

In the context of the World Wide Web, deep linking is the use of a hyperlink that links to a specific, generally searchable or indexed, piece of web content on a website (e.g. https://example.com/path/page), rather than the website's home page (e.g., https://example.com). The URL contains all the information needed to point to a particular item. Deep linking is different from mobile deep linking, which refers to directly linking to in-app content using a non-HTTP URI.

== Deep linking and HTTP ==
The technology behind the World Wide Web, the Hypertext Transfer Protocol (HTTP), does not actually make any distinction between "deep" links and any other links — all links are functionally equal. This is intentional; one of the design purposes of the Web is to allow authors to link to any published document on another site. The possibility of so-called "deep" linking is therefore built into the Web technology of HTTP and URLs by default, and while a site can attempt to restrict deep links, to do so requires extra effort. According to the World Wide Web Consortium Technical Architecture Group, "any attempt to forbid the practice of deep linking is based on a misunderstanding of the technology, and threatens to undermine the functioning of the Web as a whole".

== Usage ==
Some commercial websites object to other sites making deep links into their content either because it bypasses advertising on their main pages, passes off their content as that of the linker or, like The Wall Street Journal, they charge users for permanently valid links. Sometimes, deep linking has led to legal action such as in the 1997 case of Ticketmaster versus Microsoft, where Microsoft deep linked to Ticketmaster's site from its Sidewalk service. This case was settled when Microsoft and Ticketmaster arranged a licensing agreement. Ticketmaster later filed a similar case against Tickets.com, and the judge in this case ruled that such linking is legal as long as the ownership of the linked pages is clearly defined. The court also concluded that URLs themselves were not copyrightable, writing: "A URL is simply an address, open to the public, like the street address of a building, which, if known, can enable the user to reach the building. There is nothing sufficiently original to make the URL a copyrightable item, especially the way it is used. There appear to be no cases holding the URLs to be subject to copyright. On principle, they should not be."

== Deep linking and web technologies ==
Websites built on technologies such as Adobe Flash and AJAX often do not support deep linking. This can cause usability problems for visitors to those sites. For example, they may be unable to save bookmarks to individual pages or states of the site, use the web browser forward and back buttons, and clicking the browser refresh button may return the user to the initial page.

However, this is not a fundamental limitation of these technologies. Deep links can also preserve application state through fragment identifiers, allowing users to bookmark or return directly to a particular view within a web application. Well-known techniques and libraries such as SWFAddress and UnFocus History Keeper now exist that website creators using Flash or AJAX can use to provide deep linking to pages within their sites.

== Court rulings ==
Probably the earliest legal case arising out of deep linking was the 1996 Scottish case of The Shetland Times vs. The Shetland News, in which the Times accused the News of appropriating stories on the Times' website as its own.

At the beginning of 2006, in a case between the search engine Bixee.com and job site Naukri.com, the Delhi High Court in India prohibited Bixee.com from deep linking to Naukri.com.

The most important and widely cited U.S. opinions on deep linking are the Ninth Circuit's rulings in Kelly v. Arriba Soft Corp. and Perfect 10, Inc. v. Amazon.com, Inc.. In both cases, the court exonerated the use of deep linking. In the second of these cases, the court explained (speaking of defendant Google, whom Perfect 10 had also sued) why linking is not a copyright infringement under US law:

Google does not…display a copy of full-size infringing photographic images for purposes of the Copyright Act when Google frames in-line linked images that appear on a user's computer screen. Because Google's computers do not store the photographic images, Google does not have a copy of the images for purposes of the Copyright Act. In other words, Google does not have any "material objects…in which a work is fixed…and from which the work can be perceived, reproduced, or otherwise communicated" and thus cannot communicate a copy. Instead of communicating a copy of the image, Google provides HTML instructions that direct a user's browser to a website publisher's computer that stores the full-size photographic image. Providing these HTML instructions is not equivalent to showing a copy. First, the HTML instructions are lines of text, not a photographic image. Second, HTML instructions do not themselves cause infringing images to appear on the user's computer screen. The HTML merely gives the address of the image to the user's browser. The browser then interacts with the computer that stores the infringing image. It is this interaction that causes an infringing image to appear on the user's computer screen. Google may facilitate the user's access to infringing images. However, such assistance raised only contributory liability issues and does not constitute direct infringement of the copyright owner's display rights. …While in-line linking and framing may cause some computer users to believe they are viewing a single Google webpage, the Copyright Act, unlike the Trademark Act, does not protect a copyright holder against acts that cause consumer confusion.

In December 2006, a Texas court ruled that linking by a motocross website to videos on a Texas-based motocross video production website did not constitute fair use. The court subsequently issued an injunction. This case, SFX Motor Sports Inc. v. Davis, was not published in official reports but is available at 2006 WL 3616983.

In a February 2006 ruling, the Danish Maritime and Commercial Court (Copenhagen) found systematic crawling, indexing, and deep linking by portal site ofir.dk of real estate site Home.dk not to conflict with Danish law or the database directive of the European Union. The Court stated that search engines are desirable for the functioning of the Internet and that, when publishing information on the Internet, one must assume and accept that search engines deep link to individual pages of one's website.

== Legend ==
Website owners who do not want search engines to deep link or want them only to index specific pages can request so using the Robots Exclusion Standard (robots.txt file). People who favor deep linking often feel that content owners who do not provide a robots.txt file are implying by default that they do not object to deep linking either by search engines or others. People against deep linking often claim that content owners may be unaware of the Robots Exclusion Standard or may not use robots.txt for other reasons. Sites other than search engines can also deep link to content on other sites, so some question the relevance of the Robots Exclusion Standard to controversies about deep linking. The Robots Exclusion Standard does not programmatically enforce its directives, so it does not prevent search engines and others who do not follow polite conventions from deep linking.

== See also ==
- Copyright aspects of hyperlinking and framing
- Deep web (search)
- Framing (World Wide Web)
- Inline linking
- Intellectual Reserve v. Utah Lighthouse Ministry
- Mobile deep linking
- URI fragment
