= Metric gauge =

Metric gauge may refer to:

- Metre gauge, a rail gauge
- A instrument gauge that reads in metric measurements
- A wire gauge size expressed in metric units
