= Copyright aspects of hyperlinking and framing =

In copyright law, the legal status of hyperlinking (also termed "linking") and that of framing concern how courts address two different but related Web technologies. In large part, the legal issues concern use of these technologies to create or facilitate public access to proprietary media content — such as portions of commercial websites. When hyperlinking and framing have the effect of distributing, and creating routes for the distribution of content (information) that does not come from the proprietors of the Web pages affected by these practices, the proprietors often seek the aid of courts to suppress the conduct, particularly when the effect of the conduct is to disrupt or circumvent the proprietors' mechanisms for receiving financial compensation.

== Linking ==
In Perfect 10, Inc. v. Google, Inc., 508 F.3d 1146 (9th Cir. 2007), the Ninth Circuit held that when Google stored thumbnail versions of Perfect 10's magazine images on its server to communicate them to Google's users, Google prima facie violated Perfect 10's copyright. But the court also held that Google had a valid fair use defense. Id. at 1163-64.

The U.S. Court of Appeals for the Ninth Circuit in the Perfect 10 case, held that, when Google provided links to images, Google did not violate the provisions of the copyright law prohibiting unauthorized reproduction and distribution of copies of a work: "Because Google's computers do not store the photographic images, Google does not have a copy of the images for purposes of the Copyright Act."

This expedient has been challenged as copyright infringement. See the Arriba Soft and Perfect 10 cases (below). In the Perfect 10 case, Perfect 10 argued that Google's image pages caused viewers to believe they were seeing the images on Google's website. The court brushed this argument aside: "While in-line linking and framing may cause some computer users to believe they are viewing a single Google Web page, the Copyright Act, unlike the Trademark Act, does not protect a copyright holder against acts that cause consumer confusion."

- Using an ordinary (deep) hyperlink to the image at the remote server, so that users must click on a link on the hosting page to jump to the image. The HTML code would be https://www.supremecourt.gov/images/sectionbanner13.png. This has been protested because it bypasses everything at the other site but the image. Such protests have been largely ineffective. This argument on Kelly's behalf is articulated in the amicus curiae brief supporting Kelly by the American Society of Media Photographers:
  [I]t was the actual display of the full-size images of Kelly’s work stripped from the original context that was not fair use. Merely linking to Kelly's originating home page, on the other hand, without free-standing display of the full-size images, would not run afoul of the fair use limits established by the Panel. It is striking that nowhere in [the adversaries'] briefs do they explain why linking could not be constructed in this fashion.

== History of copyright litigation in field ==
=== European Union ===
The European Court of Justice's binding ruling in 2014 was that embedding a work could not be a violation of copyright:

The embedding in a website of a protected work which is publicly accessible on another website by means of a link using the framing technology … does not by itself constitute communication to the public within the meaning of [the EU Copyright directive] to the extent that the relevant work is neither communicated to a new public nor by using a specific technical means different from that used for the original communication.

— EDRI translation of original Courth ruling (C-348/13) of the BestWater International GmbH vs. Michael Mebes and Stefan Potsch (ECLI:EU:C:2014:2315)

In September 2016, the European Court of Justice ruled that knowingly linking to an unauthorized posting of a copyrighted work for commercial gain constituted infringement of the exclusive right to communicate the work to the public. The case surrounded GeenStijl and Sanoma; in 2011, photos were leaked from an upcoming issue of the Dutch version of Playboy (published by Sanoma) and hosted on a website known as FileFactory. GeenStijl covered the leak by displaying a thumbnail of one of the images and linking to the remainder of the unauthorized copies. The court ruled in favor of Sanoma, arguing that GeenStijl's authors knowingly reproduced and communicated a copyrighted work to the public without consent of its author, and that GeenStijl had profited from the unauthorized publication.

=== Belgium ===
==== Copiepresse v. Google ====
In September 2006, Copiepresse, a Belgian association of French-speaking newspaper editors, sued Google and obtained an injunctive order from the Belgian Court of First Instance that Google must stop deep linking to Belgian newspapers without paying royalties, or else pay a fine of €1 million daily. Many newspaper columns were critical of Copiepresse's stance.

=== Denmark ===
==== Danish Newspaper Publishers Association v. Newsbooster ====
The Bailiff's Court of Copenhagen ruled in July 2002 against the Danish Website Newsbooster, holding, in a suit brought by the Danish Newspaper Publishers Association (DNPA), that Newsbooster had violated Danish copyright law by deep linking to newspaper articles on Danish newspapers' Internet sites. Newsbooster's service allows users to enter keywords to search for news stories, and then deep links to the stories are provided. The DNPA said that this conduct was "tantamount to theft." The court ruled in favor of the DNPA, not because of the mere act of linking but because Newsbooster used the links to gain commercial advantage over the DNPA, which was unlawful under the Danish Marketing Act. The court enjoined Newsbooster's service.

==== home A/S v. Ofir A-S ====
The Maritime and Commercial Court in Copenhagen took a somewhat different view in 2005 in a suit that home A/S, a real estate chain, brought against Ofir A-S, an Internet portal (OFiR), which maintains an Internet search engine. home A/S maintains an Internet website that has a searchable database of its current realty listings. Ofir copied some database information, which the court held unprotected under Danish law, and also Ofir's search engine provided deep links to the advertisements for individual properties that home A/S listed, thus by-passing the home page and search engine of home A/S. The court held that the deep linking did not create infringement liability. The Court found that search engines are desirable as well as necessary to the function of the Internet; that it is usual that search engines provide deep links; and that businesses that offer their services on the Internet must expect that deep links will be provided to their websites. Ofir's site did not use banner advertising and its search engine allowed users, if they so chose, to go to a home page rather than directly to the advertisement of an individual property. The opinion does not appear to distinguish or explain away the difference in result from that of the Newsbooster case.

=== Germany ===
==== Holtzbrinck v. Paperboy ====
In July 2003 a German Federal Superior Court held that the Paperboy search engine could lawfully deep link to news stories. An appellate court then overturned the ruling, but the German Federal Supreme Court reversed in favor of Paperboy. "A sensible use of the immense wealth of information offered by the World Wide Web is practically impossible without drawing on the search engines and their hyperlink services (especially deep links)," the German court said.

==== Decision I-20 U 42/11 Dusseldorf Court of Appeal 8 October 2011 ====
In Germany making content available to the public on a Website by embedding the content with inline links now appears to be copyright infringement. This applies even though a copy has never been taken and kept of an image and even though the image is never "physically" part of the website. The Düsseldorf appeal court overruled the lower Court of First Instance in this case. The Defendant had included links on his blog to two photographs that appeared on the Claimant's website. No prior permission had been sought or obtained.

=== Scotland ===
==== Shetland Times Ltd v Wills ====
The first suit of prominence in the field was Shetland Times Ltd v Wills, Scottish Court of Session (Edinburgh, 24 October 1996). The Shetland Times challenged use by Wills of deep linking to pages of the newspaper on which selected articles of interest appeared. The objection was that defendant Wills thus by-passed the front and intervening pages on which advertising and other material appeared in which the plaintiff had an interest but defendant did not. The Times obtained an interim interdict (Scottish for preliminary injunction) and the case then settled.

=== United States ===
==== Washington Post v. Total News ====
In February 1997 the Washington Post, CNN, the Los Angeles Times, Dow Jones (Wall Street Journal), and Reuters sued Total News Inc. for framing their news stories on the Total News Web page. The case was settled in June 1997, on the basis that linking without framing would be used in the future.

==== Ticketmaster v. Microsoft ====
In April 1997 Ticketmaster sued Microsoft in Los Angeles federal district court for deep linking. Ticketmaster objected to Microsoft's bypassing the home and intermediate pages on Ticketmaster's site, claiming that Microsoft had "pilfered" its content and diluted its value. Microsoft's Answer raised a number of defenses explained in detail in its pleadings, including implied license, contributory negligence, and voluntary assumption of the risk. Microsoft also argued that Ticketmaster had breached an unwritten Internet code, under which any website operator has the right to link to anyone else's site. A number of articles in the trade press derided Ticketmaster's suit. The case was settled in February 1999, on confidential terms; Microsoft stopped the deep linking and instead used a link to Ticketmaster's home page.

A later case, Ticketmaster Corp. v. Tickets.com, Inc. (2000), yielded a ruling in favour of deep linking.

==== Kelly v. Arriba Soft ====
The first important U.S. decision in this field was that of the Ninth Circuit in Kelly v. Arriba Soft Corp. Kelly complained, among other things, that Arriba's search engine used thumbnails to deep link to images on his Web page. The court found that Arriba's use was highly transformative, in that it made available to Internet users a functionality not previously available, and that was not otherwise readily provided — an improved way to search for images (by using visual cues instead of verbal cues). This factor, combined with the relatively slight economic harm to Kelly, tipped the fair use balance decisively in Arriba's favour.

As in other cases, Kelly objected to linking because it caused users to bypass his home page and intervening pages. He was unable, however, to show substantial economic harm. Kelly argued largely that the part of the copyright statute violated was the public display right (17 U.S.C. § 106(5)). He was aware of the difficulties under the reproduction and distribution provisions (17 U.S.C. §§ 106(1) and (3)), which require proof that the accused infringer trafficked in copies of the protected work. The court focused on the fair use defense, however, under which it ruled in Arriba's favour.

==== Perfect 10 v. Amazon ====
In Perfect 10, Inc. v. Amazon.com, Inc., the Ninth Circuit again considered whether an image search engine's use of thumbnail was a fair use. Although the facts were somewhat closer than in the Arriba Soft case, the court nonetheless found the accused infringer's use fair because it was "highly transformative." The court explained:

We conclude that the significantly transformative nature of Google's search engine, particularly in light of its public benefit, outweighs Google's superseding and commercial uses of the thumbnails in this case. … We are also mindful of the Supreme Court's direction that "the more transformative the new work, the less will be the significance of other factors, like commercialism, that may weigh against a finding of fair use."

In addition, the court specifically addressed the copyright status of linking, in the first U.S. appellate decision to do so:

Google does not … display a copy of full-size infringing photographic images for purposes of the Copyright Act when Google frames in-line linked images that appear on a user's computer screen. Because Google's computers do not store the photographic images, Google does not have a copy of the images for purposes of the Copyright Act. In other words, Google does not have any "material objects … in which a work is fixed … and from which the work can be perceived, reproduced, or otherwise communicated" and thus cannot communicate a copy. Instead of communicating a copy of the image, Google provides HTML instructions that direct a user's browser to a website publisher's computer that stores the full-size photographic image. Providing these HTML instructions is not equivalent to showing a copy. First, the HTML instructions are lines of text, not a photographic image. Second, HTML instructions do not themselves cause infringing images to appear on the user's computer screen. The HTML merely gives the address of the image to the user's browser. The browser then interacts with the computer that stores the infringing image. It is this interaction that causes an infringing image to appear on the user's computer screen. Google may facilitate the user's access to infringing images. However, such assistance raised only contributory liability issues and does not constitute direct infringement of the copyright owner's display rights. … While in-line linking and framing may cause some computer users to believe they are viewing a single Google Web page, the Copyright Act, unlike the Trademark Act, does not protect a copyright holder against acts that cause consumer confusion.

==== State of U.S. law after Arriba Soft and Perfect 10 ====
The Arriba Soft case stood for the proposition that deep linking and actual reproduction in reduced-size copies (or preparation of reduced-size derivative works) were both excusable as fair use because the defendant's use of the work did not actually or potentially divert trade in the marketplace from the first work; and also it provided the public with a previously unavailable, very useful function of the kind that copyright law exists to promote (finding desired information on the Web). The Perfect 10 case involved similar considerations, but more of a balancing of interests was involved. The conduct was excused because the value to the public of the otherwise unavailable, useful function outweighed the impact on Perfect 10 of Google's possibly superseding use.

Moreover, in Perfect 10, the court laid down a far-reaching precedent in favour of linking and framing, which the court gave a complete pass under copyright. It concluded that "in-line linking and framing may cause some computer users to believe they are viewing a single Google Web page, [but] the Copyright Act . . . does not protect a copyright holder against acts that cause consumer confusion."

A February 2018 summary judgement from the District Court for the Southern District of New York created a new challenge to the established cases. In Goldman v. Breitbart, Justin Goldman, a photographer, posted his on-the-street photograph of Tom Brady with Boston Celtics GM Danny Ainge and others to Snapchat, which became popular over social media such as Twitter on rumors that Brady was helping with the Celtics' recruitment. Several news organizations subsequently published stories embedding the tweets with Goldman's photograph in the stories. Goldman took legal action against nine of these news agencies, claiming they violated his copyright. Judge Katherine Forrest decided in favour of Goldman and asserting the news sites violated his copyright, rejecting elements of the Perfect 10 ruling. Forrest said that as the news agencies had to take specific steps to embed the tweets with the photograph in their stories, wrote the stories to highlight those, and otherwise was not providing an automated service like Google's search engine.
