= The Clarksdale Press Register =

American weekly newspaper

- Type: Weekly newspaper
- Owner: Emmerich Newspapers
- Publisher: Josh Troy
- Founded: 1865
- Language: English
- Headquarters: 128 E. Second St. Clarksdale, MS 38614
- Circulation: 3,500 per week
- ISSN: 2831-7068 (print); 2831-7076 (web)
- OCLC number: 15003806
- Website: pressregister.com

The Clarksdale Press Register is the weekly newspaper of Clarksdale, Mississippi. Newspaper coverage has extended to both Clarksdale and Coahoma County since 1865. The Press Register is published every Wednesday and has an audience of more than 7,750 readers. The Press Register is owned by Emmerich Newspapers, the Editor and Publisher is Josh Troy.

In February 2025, the city of Clarksdale sought a temporary restraining order to pull all copies of the newspaper and delete from its website an editorial in its Feb. 6, 2025 newspaper, a direct violation of the First Amendment to the U.S. Constitution. The Editorial criticized Mayor Chuck Espy and the City of Clarksdale for failing to properly notify residents of a meeting on a proposed tax resolution. On February 18, a Mississippi judge, Crystal Wise Martin, issued a temporary restraining order requiring the paper take down the editorial. The following week, the city withdrew the lawsuit, the judge rescinded the restraining order and the editorial was reposted.
