= Metric conversion =

Metric conversion may refer to:

- Converting a non-metric quantity to the metric equivalent; see "Conversion of units"
- Conversion of a country from non-metric units to metric units; see "Metrication"
