= Overlinking =

Excess number of links on a webpage

Overlinking in a webpage or other hyperlinked text is excessive use of hyperlinks (links). It is characterized by a sentence's containing large proportions of words rendered as links. Examples include links that have little information content, such as those to specific years or dates or to common words for which the reader can be expected to understand the word's full meaning in context, and linking to unrelated, obvious topics (e.g. linking to water in an article about sailing). One or more duplicate hyperlinks will almost certainly appear needlessly on the viewer's screen.

In contrast, well-considered links are placed to direct the reader to a new spot at the point(s) where the reader is most likely to take a temporary detour to retrieve information about a specific word or phrase. Providing more hyperlink samples for the same word in a short space (as in the example of this paragraph) doesn't help much.

== Related concepts ==
At the other end of the linking spectrum are null linking and underlinking, which are phenomena in which all pointers to a likely-needed context of an unusual term are absent or have been removed. This results in reader frustration. An article is underlinked if readers encounter an unusual or unexpected term in an article (perhaps not even for the first time) and would have chosen to investigate the term but find they cannot. Readers may need to conduct an extensive search far up near the beginning of the article in order to locate the only instance of the word or term being linked, or perhaps even to find that it hasn't been linked at all.

== Impact ==
Overlinking may undermine users' attention and increase the time of processing all the possible choices; it thus adds extra load on users' working memory (cognitive overload).
