= Equilateral dimension =

Maximum number of equidistant points

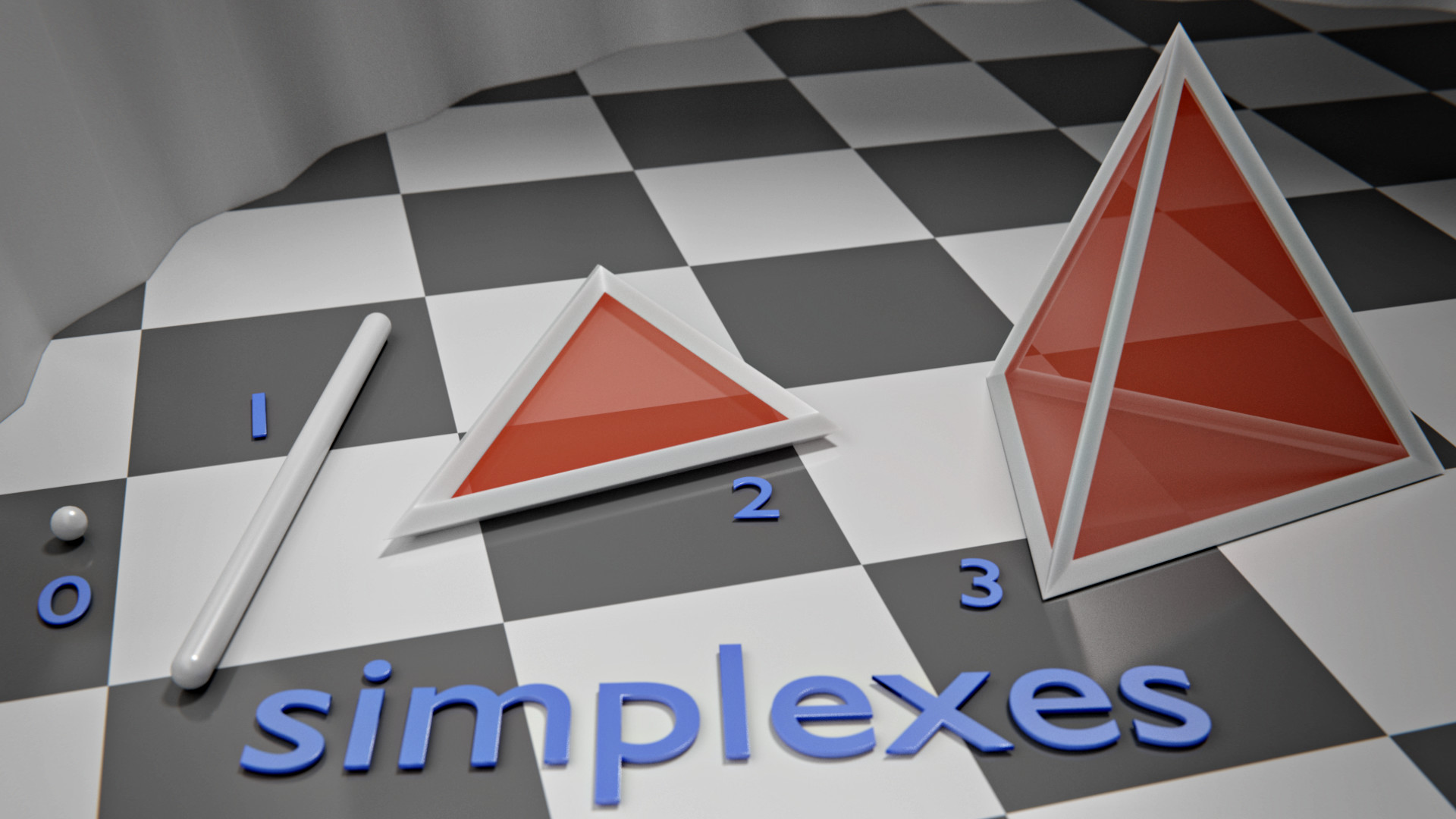
Regular simplexes of dimensions 0 through 3. The vertices of these shapes give the largest possible equally-spaced point sets for the Euclidean distances in those dimensions

In mathematics, the equilateral dimension of a metric space is the maximum size of any subset of the space whose points are all at equal distances to each other. Equilateral dimension has also been called "metric dimension", but the term "metric dimension" also has many other inequivalent usages. The equilateral dimension of $d$-dimensional Euclidean space is $d+1$, achieved by the vertices of a regular simplex, and the equilateral dimension of a $d$-dimensional vector space with the Chebyshev distance ($L^\infty$ norm) is $2^d$, achieved by the vertices of a hypercube. However, the equilateral dimension of a space with the Manhattan distance ($L^1$ norm) is not known. Kusner's conjecture, named after Robert B. Kusner, states that it is exactly $2d$, achieved by the vertices of a cross polytope.

== Lebesgue spaces ==
The equilateral dimension has been particularly studied for Lebesgue spaces, finite-dimensional normed vector spaces with the $L^p$ norm
$$\ \|x\|_p=\bigl(|x_1|^p+|x_2|^p+\cdots+|x_d|^p\bigr)^{1/p}.$$

The equilateral dimension of $L^p$ spaces of dimension $d$ behaves differently depending on the value of $p$:

Unsolved problem in mathematics
How many equidistant points exist in spaces with Manhattan distance?
More unsolved problems in mathematics
- For $p=1$, the $L^p$ norm gives rise to Manhattan distance. In this case, it is possible to find $2d$ equidistant points, the vertices of an axis-aligned cross polytope. The equilateral dimension is known to be exactly $2d$ for $d\le 6$, and to be upper bounded by $O(d\log d)$ for all $d$. Robert B. Kusner suggested in 1983 that the equilateral dimension for this case should be exactly $2d$; this suggestion (together with a related suggestion for the equilateral dimension when $p>2$) has come to be known as Kusner's conjecture.
- For $1<p<2$, the equilateral dimension is at least $(1+\varepsilon)d$ where $\varepsilon$ is a constant that depends on $p$.
- For $p=2$, the $L^p$ norm is the familiar Euclidean distance. The equilateral dimension of $d$-dimensional Euclidean space is $d+1$: the $d+1$ vertices of an equilateral triangle, regular tetrahedron, or higher-dimensional regular simplex form an equilateral set, and every equilateral set must have this form.
- For $2<p<\infty$, the equilateral dimension is at least $d+1$: for instance the $d$ basis vectors of the vector space together with another vector of the form $(-x,-x,\dots)$ for a suitable choice of $x$ form an equilateral set. Kusner's conjecture states that in these cases the equilateral dimension is exactly $d+1$. Kusner's conjecture has been proven for the special case that $p=4$. When $p$ is an odd integer the equilateral dimension is upper bounded by $O(d\log d)$.
- For $p=\infty$ (the limiting case of the $L^p$ norm for finite values of $p$, in the limit as $p$ grows to infinity) the $L^p$ norm becomes the Chebyshev distance, the maximum absolute value of the differences of the coordinates. For a $d$-dimensional vector space with the Chebyshev distance, the equilateral dimension is $2^d$: the $2^d$ vertices of an axis-aligned hypercube are at equal distances from each other, and no larger equilateral set is possible.

== Normed vector spaces ==
Equilateral dimension has also been considered for normed vector spaces with norms other than the $L^p$ norms. The problem of determining the equilateral dimension for a given norm is closely related to the kissing number problem: the kissing number in a normed space is the maximum number of disjoint translates of a unit ball that can all touch a single central ball, whereas the equilateral dimension is the maximum number of disjoint translates that can all touch each other.

For a normed vector space of dimension $d$, the equilateral dimension is at most $2^d$; that is, the $L^\infty$ norm has the highest equilateral dimension among all normed spaces. Petty (1971) asked whether every normed vector space of dimension $d$ has equilateral dimension at least $d+1$, but this remains unknown. There exist normed spaces in any dimension for which certain sets of four equilateral points cannot be extended to any larger equilateral set but these spaces may have larger equilateral sets that do not include these four points. For norms that are sufficiently close in Banach–Mazur distance to an $L^p$ norm, Petty's question has a positive answer: the equilateral dimension is at least $d+1$.

It is not possible for high-dimensional spaces to have bounded equilateral dimension: for any integer $k$, all normed vector spaces of sufficiently high dimension have equilateral dimension at least $k$. more specifically, according to a variation of Dvoretzky's theorem by Alon & Milman (1983), every $d$-dimensional normed space has a $k$-dimensional subspace that is close either to a Euclidean space or to a Chebyshev space, where
$$k\ge\exp(c\sqrt{\log d})$$
for some constant $c$. Because it is close to a Lebesgue space, this subspace and therefore also the whole space contains an equilateral set of at least $k+1$ points. Therefore, the same superlogarithmic dependence on $d$ holds for the lower bound on the equilateral dimension of $d$-dimensional space.

== Riemannian manifolds ==
For any $d$-dimensional Riemannian manifold the equilateral dimension is at least $d+1$. For a $d$-dimensional sphere, the equilateral dimension is $d+2$, the same as for a Euclidean space of one higher dimension into which the sphere can be embedded. At the same time as he posed Kusner's conjecture, Kusner asked whether there exist Riemannian metrics with bounded dimension as a manifold but arbitrarily high equilateral dimension.
