= Tickets.com =

American multinational ticketing company

- Type: Subsidiary
- Industry: Live Entertainment
- Founded: 1995; 31 years ago
- Key people: Joe Choti (Chief Executive Officer); Cristine Hurley (Chief Financial Officer and Executive Vice President, Business Operations); Curt Clausen (General Counsel)
- Products: Ticketing Technology, Ticket Sales, Ticket Resales, Marketing, Reporting Tools
- Number of employees: 200-500
- Parent: Major League Baseball Advanced Media
- Website: www.tickets.com

Tickets.com is a global ticketing technology company based in Costa Mesa, California, and is a wholly owned subsidiary of Major League Baseball Advanced Media.

== History ==
Tickets.com was originally incorporated as Entertainment Express, Inc. in 1995. In 1996, the company's business operations were launched by its co-founders Irv Richter, David Richter, Jim Cassano, and Larry Schwartz with the acquisition of Hill Arts and Entertainment Systems. That same year, the company came under the control of California venture capital firm Ventana Global. Over the next two years the company acquired a dozen others, including BASS and Tickets.com, a company incubated by Idealab. Following the Tickets.com acquisition in 1999, the entire company was rebranded as Tickets.com.

In November 1999 Tickets.com made an IPO led by Morgan Stanley and its Internet analyst Mary Meeker, which raised $75 million, with the price rising 60% on its first day of trading. In June 2000 the company negotiated a deal that would lead to its eventual acquisition, winning the exclusive rights to be the provider of online ticketing services to Major League Baseball Advance Media (MLBAM), through a multi-year agreement. In 2005, Tickets.com was sold to Major League Baseball Advanced Media, LP for $66 million.
