= NewsBreak =

News aggregation platform

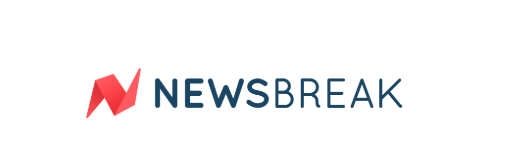
- NewsBreak Logo
- Company type: Private
- Founded: 2015
- Headquarters: Mountain View, California
- Founder: Jeff Zheng
- CEO: Jeff Zheng
- Industry: News Aggregator, News
- Website: newsbreak.com

NewsBreak is a local news aggregation platform founded in 2015. It provides a mobile app and website to deliver geographically specific news to users. The app was criticized by Reuters and NBC News for containing AI generated and erroneous stories. The company is headquartered in Mountain View, with offices in New York, Beijing and Shanghai. NewsBreak is only available in the United States.

== History ==
NewsBreak (a trade name of Particle Media) was founded by Jeff Zheng. Yi Dian Zi Xun was Particle Media's early investor and divested in 2019.

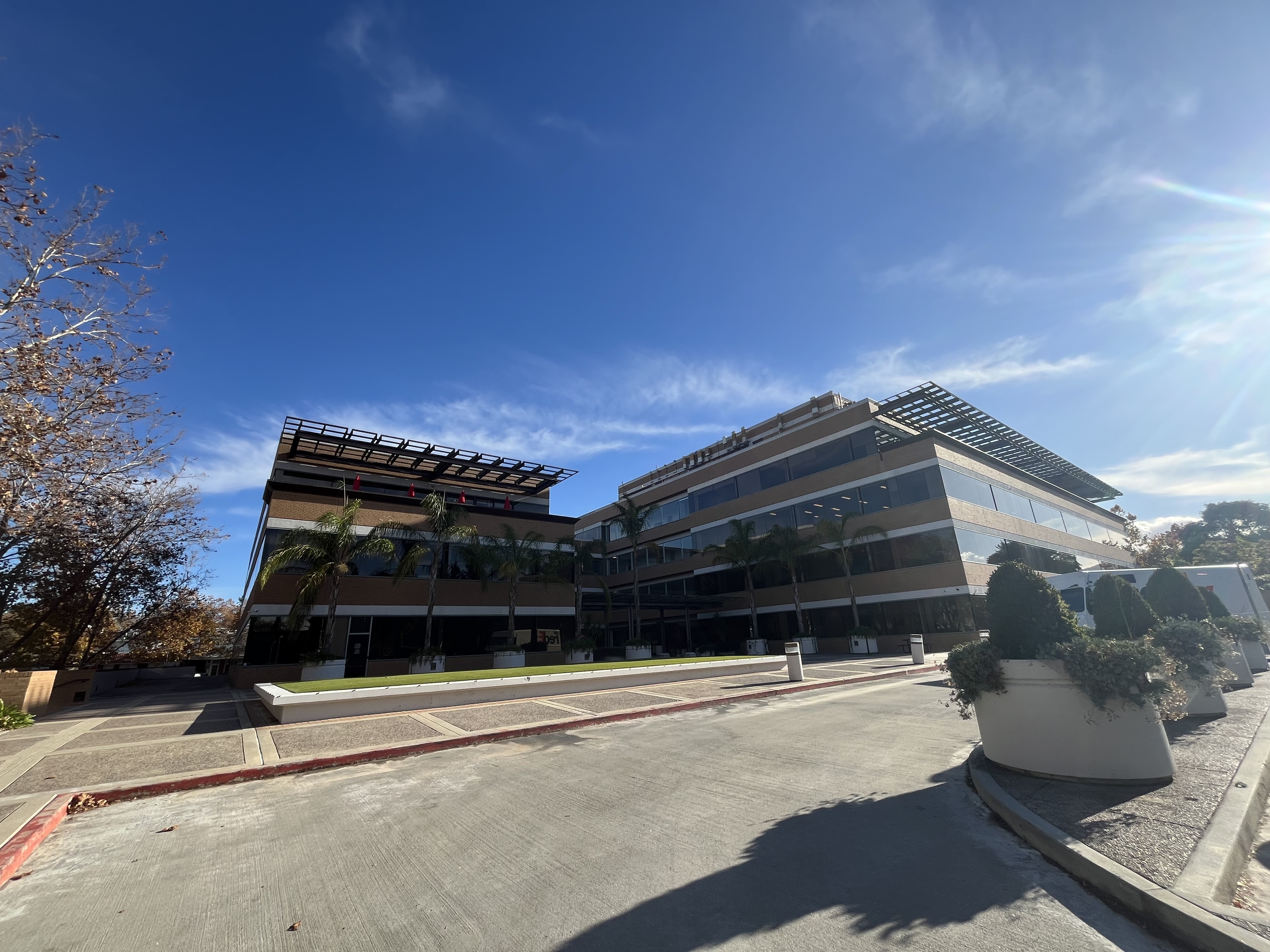
NewsBreak Headquarters, Mountain View, California

Harry Shum, former executive vice president of Microsoft’s AI and Research Group, was appointed chairman of the board at NewsBreak in 2020. He previously led Microsoft’s Bing and MSN groups.

In 2021, Francisco Partners invested in NewsBreak during its $115 million Series C funding round and joined the company's board of directors. NewsBreak focuses on local news distribution using machine learning.

== Erroneous and AI created articles ==
Reuters reported that at least 40 AI-generated stories on the app led to inaccuracies affecting local communities between 2021 and 2024. In at least two instances, this led to the dissemination of incorrect information about the services provided by non-profits, including a food bank in Colorado that "had to turn people away because NewsBreak stated incorrect times of food distributions."

After Reuters contacted NewsBreak to inquire about the erroneous stories, NewsBreak added a notice to its homepage "warning that its content 'may not always be error-free'."

In response to Reuters' reporting, Raja Krishnamoorthi of the House Select Committee on China expressed concerns about the app's true purpose and its use of "'opaque algorithms' and artificial intelligence tools to produce news."

NBC News found multiple instances of articles by a NewsBreak contributor which described crimes that never occurred, but linked to GoFundMe pages for non-existent victims and were able to collect funds for them. A spokesperson for NewsBreak stated they do not verify or edit information in user-generated news articles, instead relying on a content moderation system.

== Legal matters ==
In 2021, NewsBreak settled a lawsuit brought by Emmerich Newspapers for copyright infringement which stated that NewsBreak had republished content without permission.

In 2022, NewsBreak settled a lawsuit brought by Patch Media alleging copyright infringement due to unauthorized republication of their content by NewsBreak for $1.75 million without the admission of wrongdoing.
