= Metric dimension =

In mathematics, metric dimension may refer to:

- Metric dimension (graph theory), the minimum number of vertices of an undirected graph G in a subset S of G such that all other vertices are uniquely determined by their distances to the vertices in S
- Minkowski–Bouligand dimension (also called the metric dimension), a way of determining the dimension of a fractal set in a Euclidean space by counting the number of fixed-size boxes needed to cover the set as a function of the box size
- Equilateral dimension of a metric space (also called the metric dimension), the maximum number of points at equal distances from each other
- Hausdorff dimension, an extended non-negative real number associated with any metric space that generalizes the notion of the dimension of a real vector space
