= Backlink =

Link from another website (referrer) to that web resource (referent)

From the point of view of a given web resource (referent), a backlink is a hyperlink on another web resource (the referrer) that points to the referent. A web resource may be (for example) a website, web page, or web directory. Some other words for backlink are incoming link, inbound link, inlink, inward link, and citation. The "back" in "backlink" is to distinguish it from the types of hyperlink that are contained within the given web resource, which are either internal links or outbound links. The web resource links out with outbound links and other web resources link back to it with backlinks.

A backlink is a reference comparable to a citation. The quantity, quality, and relevance of backlinks for a web page are among the factors that search engines like Google evaluate in order to estimate how important the page is. PageRank calculates the score for each web page based on how all the web pages are connected among themselves, and is one of the variables that Google Search uses to determine how high a web page should go in search results. This weighting of backlinks is analogous to citation analysis of books, scholarly papers, and academic journals. A Topical PageRank has been researched and implemented as well, which gives more weight to backlinks coming from the page of a same topic as a target page.

== Backlinks and search engines ==
Search engines often use the number of backlinks that a website has as one of the most important factors for determining that website's search engine ranking, popularity and importance. Google's description of its PageRank system (January 1998), for instance, noted that "Google interprets a link from page A to page B as a vote, by page A, for page B." Knowledge of this form of search engine rankings has fueled a portion of the search engine optimization (SEO) industry commonly termed linkspam, where a company attempts to place as many inbound links as possible to their site regardless of the context of the originating site. In January 2017, Google launched Penguin 4 update which devalued such link spam practices.

The significance of search engine rankings is high, and it is regarded as a crucial parameter in online business and the conversion rate of visitors to any website, particularly when it comes to online shopping. Blog commenting, guest blogging, article submission, press release distribution, social media engagements, and forum posting can be used to increase backlinks.

Websites often employ SEO techniques to increase the number of backlinks pointing to their website. Some methods are free for use by everyone whereas some methods, like linkbaiting, require quite a bit of planning and marketing to work. There are also paid techniques to increase the number of backlinks to a target site. For example, private blog networks can be used to purchase backlinks. It has been estimated that the average cost of buying a link in 2019 was $291.55 and $391.55, when marketing blogs were excluded from the calculation.

There are several factors that determine the value of a backlink. Backlinks from authoritative sites on a given topic are highly valuable. If both sites and pages have content geared toward the topic, the backlink is considered relevant and believed to have strong influence on the search engine rankings of the web page granted the backlink. A backlink represents a favorable 'editorial vote' for the receiving webpage from another granting webpage. Another important factor is the anchor text of the backlink. Anchor text is the descriptive labeling of the hyperlink as it appears on a web page. Search engine bots (i.e., spiders, crawlers, etc.) examine the anchor text to evaluate how relevant it is to the content on a webpage. Backlinks can be generated by submissions, such as directory submissions, forum submission, social bookmarking, business listing, blog submissions, etc. Anchor text and webpage content congruency are highly weighted in search engine results page (SERP) rankings of a webpage with respect to any given keyword query by a search engine user.

Changes to the algorithms that produce search engine rankings can place a heightened focus on relevance to a particular topic. While some backlinks might be from sources containing highly valuable metrics, they could also be unrelated to the consumer's query or interest. An example of this would be a link from a popular shoe blog (with valuable metrics) to a site selling vintage pencil sharpeners. While the link appears valuable, it provides little to the consumer in terms of relevance.

== See also ==
- Link farm – Group of websites that link to each other
- Linkback – Method of notifications for web authors
- Methods of website linking – Efforts to increase the number of high-quality links pointing to a website
- Internal links – Hyperlinks to resources in the same domain or website
- PageRank – Algorithm used by Google Search to rank web pages
- Search engine optimization – Practice and strategies of increasing online visibility
- Search engine results page – Display of results from a search
- Trackback – Type of linkback method for Web authors
- Search engine optimization metrics – Collection, analysis, and reporting of web data to optimize search engines
- Website audit – Concept in search engine optimization
