= Hyperlink =

Method of referencing visual computer data

An example of a hyperlink as commonly seen in a web browser, with a computer mouse pointer hovering above it

Visual abstraction of several documents being connected by hyperlinks

In computing, a hyperlink, or simply a link, is a digital reference providing direct access to data by a user's clicking or tapping. A hyperlink points to a whole document or to a specific element within a document. Hypertext is text with hyperlinks. The text that is linked from is known as anchor text. A software system that is used for viewing and creating hypertext is a hypertext system, and to create a hyperlink is to hyperlink (or simply to link). A user following hyperlinks is said to navigate or browse the hypertext.

The document containing a hyperlink is known as its source document. For example, in content from Wikipedia or Google Search, many words and terms in the text are hyperlinked to definitions of those terms. Hyperlinks are often used to implement reference mechanisms such as tables of contents, footnotes, bibliographies, indexes, and glossaries.

In some hypertext, hyperlinks can be bidirectional: they can be followed in two directions, so both ends act as anchors and as targets. More complex arrangements exist, such as many-to-many links.

The effect of following a hyperlink may vary with the hypertext system and may sometimes depend on the link itself; for instance, on the World Wide Web most hyperlinks cause the target document to replace the document being displayed, but some are marked to cause the target document to open in a new window (or, perhaps, in a new tab). Another possibility is transclusion, for which the link target is a document fragment that replaces the link anchor within the source document. Not only persons browsing the document may follow hyperlinks. These hyperlinks may also be followed automatically by programs. A program that traverses the hypertext, following each hyperlink and gathering all the retrieved documents is known as a Web spider or crawler.

== Links ==
=== Inline links ===
An inline link displays remote content without the need for embedding the content. The remote content may be accessed with or without the user following the link.

An inline link may display a modified version of the content; for instance, instead of an image, a thumbnail, low resolution preview, cropped section, or magnified section may be shown. The full content is then usually available on demand, as is the case with print publishing software – e.g., with an external link. This allows for smaller file sizes and quicker response to changes when the full linked content is not needed, as is the case when rearranging a page layout.

=== Anchor links ===
An anchor hyperlink (anchor link) is a link bound to a portion of a document, which is often called a fragment. The fragment is generally a portion of text or a heading, though not necessarily. For instance, it may also be a hot area in an image (image map in HTML), a designated, often irregular part of an image.

Fragments are marked with anchors (in any of various ways), which is why a link to a fragment is called an anchor link (that is, a link to an anchor). For example, in XML, the element <anchor id="name" />" provides anchoring capability (as long as the DTD or schema defines it), and in wiki markup, {{anchor|name}} is a typical example of implementing it. In word processor apps, anchors can be inserted where desired and may be called bookmarks. In URLs, the hash character (#) precedes the name of the anchor for the fragment.

One way to define a hot area in an image is by a list of coordinates that indicate its boundaries. For example, a political map of Africa may have each country hyperlinked to further information about that country. A separate invisible hot area interface allows for swapping skins or labels within the linked hot areas without repetitive embedding of links in the various skin elements.

Text hyperlink. Hyperlink is embedded into a word or a phrase and makes this text clickable.

Image hyperlink. Hyperlink is embedded into an image and makes this image clickable.

Bookmark hyperlink. Hyperlink is embedded into a text or an image and takes visitors to another part of a web page.

E-mail hyperlink. Hyperlink is embedded into e-mail address and allows visitors to send an e-mail message to this e-mail address.

=== Fat links ===
A fat link (also known as a "one-to-many" link, an "extended link" or a "multi-tailed link") is a hyperlink which leads to multiple endpoints; the link is a set-valued function.

== Uses in various technologies ==
=== HTML ===
Tim Berners-Lee saw the possibility of using hyperlinks to link any information to any other information over the Internet. Hyperlinks were therefore integral to the creation of the World Wide Web. Web pages are written in the hypertext mark-up language HTML.

This is what a hyperlink to the home page of the W3C organization could look like in HTML code:

<a href="https://www.w3.org/">W3C organization website</a>

This HTML code consists of several tags:

- The hyperlink starts with an anchor opening tag <a, and includes a hyperlink reference href="https://www.w3.org/" to the URL for the page. (The URL is enclosed in quotes.)
- The URL is followed by >, marking the end of the anchor opening tag.
- The words that follow identify what is being linked; this is the only part of the code that is ordinarily visible on the screen when the page is rendered, but when the cursor hovers over the link, many browsers display the target URL somewhere on the screen, such as in the lower left-hand corner.
- Typically these words are underlined and colored (for example, blue for a link that has not yet been visited and purple for a link already visited).
- The anchor closing tag (</a>) terminates the hyperlink code.
- The <a> tag can also consist of various attributes such as the "rel" attribute which specifies the relationship between the current document and linked document.

Webgraph is a graph, formed from web pages as vertices and hyperlinks, as directed edges.

=== XLink ===
The W3C recommendation called XLink describes hyperlinks that offer a far greater degree of functionality than those offered in HTML. These extended links can be multidirectional, remove linking from, within, and between XML documents. It can also describe simple links, which are unidirectional and therefore offer no more functionality than hyperlinks in HTML.

=== Permalinks ===
Permalinks are URLs that are intended to remain unchanged for many years into the future, yielding hyperlinks that are less susceptible to link rot. Permalinks are often rendered simply, that is, as friendly URLs, so as to be easy for people to type and remember. Permalinks are used in order to point and redirect readers to the same Web page, blog post or any online digital media.

The scientific literature is a place where link persistence is crucial to the public knowledge. A 2013 study in BMC Bioinformatics analyzed 15,000 links in abstracts from Thomson Reuters' Web of Science citation index, founding that the median lifespan of Web pages was 9.3 years, and just 62% were archived. The median lifespan of a Web page constitutes high-degree variable, but its order of magnitude usually is of some months.

=== File based hyperlinks ===
==== Internet shortcut (.url) file ====
An Internet shortcut file, also known as the URL file format, has the file extension .url (possibly hidden by default in the graphical user interface), and is the file format in Windows systems used for hyperlinks to the Internet.

Internet shortcuts are text files, but their internal structure is similar to that of an INI file. Opening them in the graphical file browser of Windows or macOS (but not Linux) will open the link in the default web browser. Internet shortcut files can be easily made by hand, as the minimum features needed to operate as a hyperlink are simply the [InternetShortcut] header and the URL= key-value pair. Other key-value pairs are irregularly supported across operating systems. An example of a valid Windows Internet Shortcut with some specialized key-value pairs is shown below:

[InternetShortcut]
URL=https://www.wikipedia.org/
WorkingDirectory=C:\WINDOWS
ShowCommand=7
IconIndex=1
IconFile=C:\WINDOWS\SYSTEM\url.dll
Modified=20F06BA06D07BD014D
HotKey=1601

==== macOS .webloc file ====
On macOS systems, the specialized file format for file based hyperlinks is the .webloc file. It uses XML Property list syntax:

<?xml version="1.0" encoding="UTF-8"?>
<!DOCTYPE plist PUBLIC "-//Apple//DTD PLIST 1.0//EN" "http://www.apple.com/DTDs/PropertyList-1.0.dtd">
<plist version="1.0">
<dict>
	<key>URL</key>
	<string>https://www.wikipedia.org/</string>
</dict>
</plist>

==== Linux Freedesktop.org .desktop file ====
A file based hyperlink under Unix/Linux with a desktop environment is stored in a .desktop file. It is only supported under Linux. It is a text file with a syntax highly similar to the Windows URL file described above. An example of a valid Freedesktop.org .desktop file is shown below:

[Desktop Entry]
Encoding=UTF-8
Type=Link
Name=Wikipedia
URL=https://www.wikipedia.org/

==== link.html file ====
A Windows, macOS, and Linux cross-platform file based hyperlink can be implemented with an unofficial link.html style file:

<!DOCTYPE html><html lang="en">
<!--
Example of a link.html file: i.e. a file based hyperlink that works cross-platform on Windows, macOS, and Linux. 
-->
<head>
  <meta http-equiv="refresh" content="0; url=https://www.wikipedia.org" />
  <title>Redirecting to https://www.wikipedia.org ...</title>
</head>
<body>
  Loading <a href="https://www.wikipedia.org">https://www.wikipedia.org</a> ...
</body>
</html>

== How hyperlinks work in HTML ==
A link from one domain to another is said to be outbound from its source anchor and inbound to its target.

The most common destination anchor is a URL used in the World Wide Web. This can refer to a document, e.g. a webpage, or other resource, or to a position in a webpage. The latter is achieved by means of an HTML element with a "name" or "id" attribute at that position of the HTML document. The URL of the position is the URL of the webpage with a fragment identifier – "#id attribute" – appended.

When linking to PDF documents from an HTML page the "id attribute" can be replaced with syntax that references a page number or another element of the PDF, for example, "#page=386".

=== Link behavior in web browsers ===
A web browser usually displays a hyperlink in some distinguishing way, e.g. in a different color, font or style, or with certain symbols following to visualize link target or document types. This is also called link decoration. The behavior and style of links can be specified using the Cascading Style Sheets (CSS) language.

In a graphical user interface, the appearance of a mouse cursor may change into a hand motif to indicate a link. In most graphical web browsers, links are displayed in underlined blue text when they have not been visited, but underlined purple text when they have. When the user activates the link (e.g., by clicking on it with the mouse) the browser displays the link's target. If the target is not an HTML file, depending on the file type and on the browser and its plugins, another program may be activated to open the file.

The HTML code contains some or all of the five main characteristics of a link:

- link destination ("href" pointing to a URL)
- link label
- link title
- link target
- link class or link id

It uses the HTML element "a" with the attribute "href" (HREF is an abbreviation for "Hypertext REFerence") and optionally also the attributes "title", "target", and "class" or "id":

<a href="URL" title="link title" target="link target" class="link class">link label</a>

To embed a link into a web page, blogpost, or comment, it may take this form:

<a href="https://example.com/">Example</a>

In a typical web browser, this would display as the underlined word "Example" in blue, which when clicked would take the user to the example.com website. This contributes to a clean, easy to read text or document.

By default, browsers will usually display hyperlinks as such:

- An unvisited link is usually blue and underlined
- A visited link is usually purple and underlined
- An active link is usually red and underlined

When the cursor hovers over a link, depending on the browser and graphical user interface, some informative text about the link can be shown, popping up, not in a regular window, but in a special hover box, which disappears when the cursor is moved away (sometimes it disappears anyway after a few seconds, and reappears when the cursor is moved away and back). Mozilla Firefox, IE, Opera, and many other web browsers all show the URL. In addition, the URL is commonly shown in the status bar.

Normally, a link opens in the current frame or window, but sites that use frames and multiple windows for navigation can add a special "target" attribute to specify where the link loads. If no window exists with that name, a new window is created with the ID, which can be used to refer to the window later in the browsing session.

Creation of new windows is probably the most common use of the "target" attribute. To prevent accidental reuse of a window, the special window names "_blank" and "_new" are usually available, and always cause a new window to be created. It is especially common to see this type of link when one large website links to an external page. The intention in that case is to ensure that the person browsing is aware that there is no endorsement of the site being linked to by the site that was linked from. However, the attribute is sometimes overused and can sometimes cause many windows to be created even while browsing a single site.

Another special page name is "_top", which causes any frames in the current window to be cleared away so that browsing can continue in the full window.

== History ==
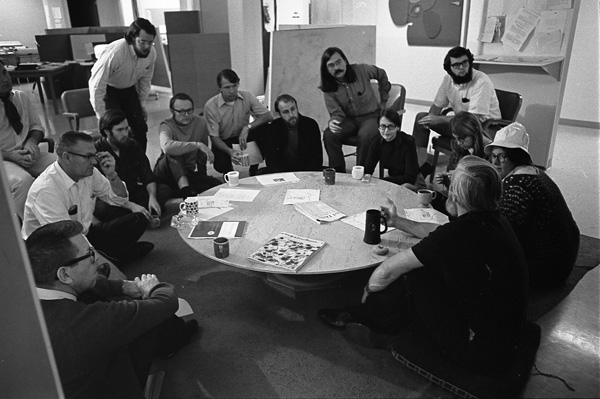
Douglas Engelbart and his team at SRI, 1969

The term "link" was coined in 1965 (or possibly 1964) by Ted Nelson at the start of Project Xanadu. Nelson had been inspired by "As We May Think", a popular 1945 essay by Vannevar Bush. In the essay, Bush described a microfilm-based machine (the Memex) in which one could link any two pages of information into a "trail" of related information, and then scroll back and forth among pages in a trail as if they were on a single microfilm reel.

In a series of books and articles published from 1964 through 1980, Nelson transposed Bush's concept of automated cross-referencing into the computer context, made it applicable to specific text strings rather than whole pages, generalized it from a local desk-sized machine to a theoretical proprietary worldwide computer network, and advocated the creation of such a network. Though Nelson's Xanadu Corporation was eventually funded by Autodesk in the 1980s, it never created this proprietary public-access network. Meanwhile, working independently, a team led by Douglas Engelbart (with Jeff Rulifson as chief programmer) was the first to implement the hyperlink concept for scrolling within a single document (1966), and soon after for connecting between paragraphs within separate documents (1968), with NLS. Ben Shneiderman working with graduate student Dan Ostroff designed and implemented the highlighted link in the HyperTIES system in 1983. HyperTIES was used to produce the world's first electronic journal, the July 1988 Communications of the ACM, which was cited as the source for the link concept in Tim Berners-Lee's Spring 1989 manifesto for the Web. In 1988, Ben Shneiderman and Greg Kearsley used HyperTIES to publish "Hypertext Hands-On!", the world's first electronic book.

Released in 1987 for the Apple Macintosh, the database program HyperCard allowed for hyperlinking between various pages within a document, as well as to other documents and separate applications on the same computer. In 1990, Windows Help, which was introduced with Microsoft Windows 3.0, had widespread use of hyperlinks to link different pages in a single help file together; in addition, it had a visually different kind of hyperlink that caused a popup help message to appear when clicked, usually to give definitions of terms introduced on the help page. The first widely used open protocol that included hyperlinks from any Internet site to any other Internet site was the Gopher protocol from 1991. It was soon eclipsed by HTML after the 1993 release of the Mosaic browser (which could handle Gopher links as well as HTML links). HTML's advantage was the ability to mix graphics, text, and hyperlinks, unlike Gopher, which just had menu-structured text and hyperlinks.

== Legal issues ==
While hyperlinking among webpages is an intrinsic feature of the web, some websites object to being linked by other websites; some have claimed that linking to them is not allowed without permission.

Contentious in particular are deep links, which do not point to a site's home page or other entry point designated by the site owner, but to content elsewhere, allowing the user to bypass the site's own designated flow, and inline links, which incorporate the content in question into the pages of the linking site, making it seem part of the linking site's own content unless an explicit attribution is added.

In certain jurisdictions, it is or has been held that hyperlinks are not merely references or citations, but are devices for copying web pages. In the Netherlands, Karin Spaink was initially convicted in this way of copyright infringement by linking, although this ruling was overturned in 2003. The courts that advocate this view see the mere publication of a hyperlink that connects to illegal material to be an illegal act in itself, regardless of whether referencing illegal material is illegal. In 2004, Josephine Ho was acquitted of 'hyperlinks that corrupt traditional values' in Taiwan

In 2000, British Telecom sued Prodigy, claiming that Prodigy infringed its patent (U.S. patent 4,873,662) on web hyperlinks. After litigation, a court found for Prodigy, ruling that British Telecom's patent did not cover web hyperlinks.

In United States jurisprudence, there is a distinction between the mere act of linking to someone else's website, and linking to content that is illegal (e.g., gambling illegal in the US) or infringing (e.g., illegal MP3 copies). Several courts have found that merely linking to someone else's website, even if by bypassing commercial advertising, is not copyright or trademark infringement, regardless of how much someone else might object. Linking to illegal or infringing content can be sufficiently problematic to give rise to legal liability. Compare for a summary of the current status of US copyright law as to hyperlinking, see the discussion regarding the Arriba Soft and Perfect 10 cases.

Somewhat controversially, Vuestar Technologies has tried to enforce patents applied for by its owner, Ronald Neville Langford, around the world relating to search techniques using hyperlinked images to other websites or web pages.

== See also ==
- Backlink
- Dereference (operator)
- Internal link
- Link building
- Link rot
- Object hyperlinking
- Overlinking
- PageRank
- URI fragment
- Xenu's Link Sleuth
- Nofollow
