= Inline linking =

Use of a linked object on one web page to a second site

Inline linking (also known as hotlinking, piggy-backing, direct linking, offsite image grabs, bandwidth theft, or leeching) is the practice of using or embedding a linked object—often an image—from one website onto a webpage of another website. In this process, the second site does not host the object itself but instead loads it directly from the original source, creating an inline link to the hosting site.

== HTTP and inline linking ==
The Hypertext Transfer Protocol (HTTP), the technology behind the World Wide Web, does not differentiate between different types of links—all links are functionally equal. As a result, resources can be linked from any server and loaded onto a web page regardless of their original location.

When a website is visited, the browser first downloads the HTML document containing the web page's textual content. This document may reference additional resources, including other HTML files, images, scripts, or stylesheet. Within the HTML, <img> tags specify the URLs of images to be displayed on the page. If the <img> tag does not specify a server, the web browser assumes that the image is hosted on the same server as the parent page (e.g., <img src="picture.jpg" />). If the <img> tag contains an absolute URL, the browser retrieves the image from an external server (e.g., <img src="http://www.example.com/picture.jpg" />).

When a browser downloads an HTML page containing such an image, the browser will contact the remote server to request the image content.

== Common uses ==
The ability to display content from one site within another is part of the original design of the Web's hypertext medium. Common uses include:

- Avoiding copyright infringement: it is copyright infringement to make copies of a work for which the person making copies has no license, but there is no infringement when the re-user provides a simple text link within an HTML document that points to the location of the original image or file (simply called a "link").
- Web architects may deliberately segregate the images of a site on one server or a group of servers. Hosting images on separate servers allows the site to divide the bandwidth requirements between servers. As an example, the high-volume site Slashdot stores its "front page" at slashdot.org, individual stories on servers such as games.slashdot.org or it.slashdot.org, and serves images for each host from images.slashdot.org.
- An article on one site may choose to refer to copyrighted images or content on another site via inline linking, which may avoid rights and ownership issues that copying the original files could raise. However, this practice is generally discouraged due to resulting bandwidth loading of the source, and the source provider is often offended because the viewer is not seeing the whole original page, which provides the intended context of the image.
- Many web pages include banner ads. Banner ads are images hosted by a company that acts as middleman between the advertisers and the websites on which the ads appear. The <img> tag may specify a URL to a CGI script on the ad server, including a string uniquely identifying the site producing the traffic, and possibly other information about the person viewing the ad, previously collected and associated with a cookie. The CGI script determines which image to send in response to the request.
- Some websites hotlink from a faster server to increase client loading speed.
- Hit counters or Web counters show how many times a page has been loaded. Several companies provide hit counters that are maintained off site and displayed with an inline link.

== Controversial uses ==
The blurring of boundaries between sites can lead to other problems when the site violates users' expectations. Other times, inline linking can be done for malicious purposes.

- Content sites where the object is stored and from which it is retrieved may not like the new placement.
- Inline linking to an image stored on another site increases the bandwidth use of that site even though the site is not being viewed as intended. The complaint may be the loss of ad revenue or changing the perceived meaning through an unapproved context.
- Cross-site scripting and phishing attacks may include inline links to a legitimate site to gain the confidence of a victim.
- Pay-per-content services may attempt to restrict access to their content through complex scripting and inline linking techniques.
- Inline objects can be used to perform drive-by attacks on the client, exploiting faults in the code that interprets the objects. When an object is stored on an external server, the referring site has no control over if and when an originally beneficial object's content is replaced by malicious content.
- The requests for inline objects usually contain the referrer information. This leaks information about the browsed pages to the servers hosting the objects (see web visitor tracking).

== Prevention ==
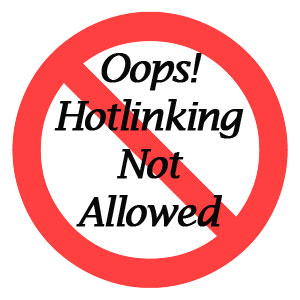
A placeholder image used when attempting to hotlink to a website which disallows it

=== Client side ===
Most web browsers will blindly follow the URL for inline links, even though it is a frequent security complaint. Embedded images may be used as a web bug to track users or to relay information to a third party. Many ad filtering browser tools will restrict this behavior to varying degrees.

=== Server side ===
Some servers are programmed to use the HTTP referer header to detect hotlinking and return a condemnatory message, commonly in the same format, in place of the expected image or media clip. Most servers can be configured to partially protect hosted media from inline linking, usually by not serving the media or by serving a different file.

URL rewriting is often used (e.g., mod_rewrite with Apache HTTP Server) to reject or redirect attempted hotlinks to images and media to an alternative resource. Most types of electronic media can be redirected this way, including video files, music files, and animations (such as Flash).

Other solutions usually combine URL rewriting with some custom server side scripting to allow hotlinking for a short time, or in more complex setups, to allow the hotlinking but return an alternative image with reduced quality and size and thus reduce the bandwidth load when requested from a remote server. All hotlink prevention measures risk deteriorating the user experience on the third-party website.

== Copyright issues raised by inline linking ==
The most significant legal fact about inline linking, relative to copyright law considerations, is that the inline linker does not place a copy of the image file on its own Internet server. Rather, the inline linker places a pointer on its Internet server that points to the server on which the proprietor of the image has placed the image file. This pointer causes a user's browser to jump to the proprietor's server and fetch the image file to the user's computer. US courts have considered this a decisive fact in copyright analysis. Thus, in Perfect 10, Inc. v. Amazon.com, Inc., the United States Court of Appeals for the Ninth Circuit explained why inline linking did not violate US copyright law:

Google does not...display a copy of full-size infringing photographic images for purposes of the Copyright Act when Google frames in-line linked images that appear on a user's computer screen. Because Google's computers do not store the photographic images, Google does not have a copy of the images for purposes of the Copyright Act. In other words, Google does not have any "material objects...in which a work is fixed...and from which the work can be perceived, reproduced, or otherwise communicated" and thus cannot communicate a copy. Instead of communicating a copy of the image, Google provides HTML instructions that direct a user's browser to a website publisher's computer that stores the full-size photographic image. Providing these HTML instructions is not equivalent to showing a copy. First, the HTML instructions are lines of text, not a photographic image. Second, HTML instructions do not themselves cause infringing images to appear on the user's computer screen. The HTML merely gives the address of the image to the user's browser. The browser then interacts with the computer that stores the infringing image. It is this interaction that causes an infringing image to appear on the user's computer screen. Google may facilitate the user's access to infringing images. However, such assistance raised only contributory liability issues and does not constitute direct infringement of the copyright owner's display rights. ...While in-line linking and framing may cause some computer users to believe they are viewing a single Google webpage, the Copyright Act...does not protect a copyright holder against [such] acts....

== See also ==
- Copyright aspects of hyperlinking and framing
- Deep linking
- Transclusion
