= Timeline of Google Search =

Google Search, offered by Google, is the most widely used search engine on the World Wide Web as of 2023, with over eight billion searches a day. This page covers key events in the history of Google's search service.

For a history of Google the company, including all of Google's products, acquisitions, and corporate changes, see the history of Google page.

== Big picture ==
Time period	Development
1996–1997	Development of basic technology, launch of search engine, attachments like Gmail and Classroom come later.
2000	Internationalization: search is launched in 13 new languages.
2001–2004	Google launches many new search categories, such as Google News, Google Books, and Google Scholar.
2002 onward	The beginning of explicitly announced search algorithm updates.
2008–2010	Faster search experience for user: Google Suggest (experimental launch 2004, integrated into main search engine 2008), Google Instant (2010), and Google Instant Previews.
2005, 2009, 2012	Google starts using web histories to help in searches (2005), experimentally launches social search (2009), and launches Search Plus Your World (2012).
2009–2010	Caffeine update for faster indexing of the web and fresher and on-topic search results.
2011–2014	Google Panda (an update to some parts of Google's search algorithm) is released in 2011, with announced updates continuing till September 2014 (Panda 4.1). Stated goals include cracking down on spam, content farms, scrapers, and websites with a high ad-to-content ratio.
2012–2014	Google Penguin (an update to some parts of Google's search algorithm) is released in 2012, with the goal of concentrating on webspam. The last named update is in October 2014. Starting December 2014, Penguin moves to continuous updates (Penguin Everflux).
2012 onward	Google integrates Google Knowledge Graph into its search results.
2013	Google releases Google Hummingbird, an update that may enable semantic search in the future and integrate better with the Knowledge Graph.
2014 onward	Google makes a major update to its algorithm for local search. The update gets the name Google Pigeon.
2015 onward	Google alerts webmasters to mobile usability issues in January, and announces a major update to its search algorithm, to be rolled out starting April 21, 2015, that will heavily demote mobile-unfriendly sites for web searches on mobile devices.
2019 April	In early April 2019, a large de-indexing bug was reported to be dropping pages out of the index. Google wrote on April 11, 2019, "The indexing issue has now been fully resolved. We apologize for the inconvenience. We appreciate your patience as we restored normal operation."

== Full timeline ==
Year	Month and date (if available)	Event type	Event
1996	August	Prelude	Larry Page and Sergey Brin, graduate students in computer science at Stanford University, begin working on BackRub, the precursor to Google Search. Page begins work alone initially, supported by a National Science Foundation Graduate Fellowship, and Brin joins him shortly thereafter. The project is an outgrowth of their work on the Stanford Digital Library Project. Scott Hassan is the project's lead programmer, writing much of the code for the original Google Search engine. Web crawling begins in March.
1997	September 15	Domain	The domain Google.com is registered.
2000	May 9	Internationalization	Google adds ten new languages: French, German, Italian, Swedish, Finnish, Spanish, Portuguese, Dutch, Norwegian and Danish.
2000	September 12	Internationalization	Google launches search services in Japanese, Chinese, and Korean.
2000	October	Advertising	Google AdWords launches with 350 customers.
2000	December	User experience	Google Toolbar is released, allowing people to search without visiting the Google homepage, and also offering them more information about the webpages they visit. Some commentators have argued that this marks the beginning of search engine optimization and the Google Dance.
2001	July	Search category	Google launches Google Image Search with over 250 million images in its search database.
2001	December	Review	Google releases its first annual Google Zeitgeist.
2002	September	Search category	Google launches Google News.
2002	September	Search algorithm update	Google makes the first publicly announced update to its search algorithm. A number of Internet commentators view this as the death of PageRank (the name for Google's system for ranking pages) and a significant decline in the quality of Google's search results.
2003	February	Search algorithm update	Google announces the Boston update at SES Boston. The update saw major algorithmic changes and the promise of frequent index updates.
2003	April	Search algorithm update	Google announces the Cassandra update. The update claims to crack down on link spam, including mutual links between co-owned websites, as well as hidden text and hidden links.
2003	May	Search algorithm update	Google announces the Dominic update. Commentators believed that the update affected the way backlinks were counted, and many webmasters reported new bots from Google that bounced.
2003	June	Search algorithm update	Google announces what will later turn out to have been the last of its regular monthly updates. This update is called the Esmeralda update.
2003	July	Search algorithm update	Google announces the Fritz update, and also a change to its update policy, as it moves towards continuous rather than batch processing of updates.
2003	September	Search algorithm update	Google announces a "supplemental index" in order to be able to index some parts of the web more rapidly. The supplemental index would eventually be scrapped.
2003	November	Search algorithm update	Google announces the Florida update, which commentators consider game-changing in that it completely destroyed the value of 1990s SEO tactics and ushered in a new era of search engine optimization.
2003	December	Search category	Google launches Google Print, that would later become Google Books.
2004	January	Search algorithm update	Google announces the Austin update, to continue with the work of combating SEO tactics that Florida had made good progress on.
2004	February 17–20	Search algorithm update	Google announces the Brandy update, a massive index expansion, Latent Semantic Indexing (LSI), increased attention to anchor text relevance, and the concept of link "neighborhoods."
2004	October	Search category	Google launches Google Scholar, its search service for academic publications.
2004	December	User experience	Google Suggest is introduced as a Google Labs feature.
2005	January	Search algorithm update	To combat link spam, Google, Yahoo! and Microsoft collectively introduce the nofollow attribute.
2005	February 2	Search algorithm update	Google announces the Allegra update, whose effects are unclear.
2005	May	Search algorithm update	Google announces the Bourbon update.
2005	June	Webmaster tools	Google allows webmasters to submit XML sitemaps via Webmaster Tools, bypassing the need for HTML sitemaps.
2005	June	User experience	Google launches personalized search that automatically taps into users' web histories.
2005	June	User experience	Google launches Google Mobile Web Search.
2005	September	Search algorithm update	Although Google denies running an update, Matt Cutts clarifies that PageRank was refreshed for some pages recently (with a three-month refresh cycle) causing changes to many site ranks. Observers call this the Gilligan update.
2005	September–November	Search algorithm update	Google announces and rolls out the Jagger update in three stages, one in September, one in October, one in November.
2005	December (rollout continues till March 2006)	Search algorithm update	Google begins rolling out the Big Daddy update, continuing for the next few months until March 2006. The update changes URL canonization, site redirects, and related items.
2006	May	Review	Google releases Google Trends to make it easy to visualize the popularity of searches over time.
2007	May 16	Search algorithm update + user experience	Google launches Universal Search, integrating traditional search results with results from Google News, Google Image Search, Google Video Search, and other verticals. This is believed to be a major milestone in the user experience.
2007	June	Search algorithm update	The Buffy update happens. It is not considered a deliberate update, but rather an accumulation of many smaller changes.
2008	March/April	Search algorithm update	The Dewey update seems to lead to a large-scale shuffling of results. Some observers believe that Google is pushing its own properties, such as Google Books, but evidence of this is limited.
2008	August 25	User experience	Google Suggest (later called Autocomplete), originally launched as a Labs feature in December 2004, now becomes part of Google's main site.
2009	February	Search algorithm update	The Vince update happens. Matt Cutts calls it a minor change, but some SEO commentators consider it major.
2009	February	Webmaster tools	Google, Microsoft, and Yahoo! announce joint support for tags that help bots identify canonical versions of webpages without affecting human visitors.
2009	August 10 (announced), rollout completed and made live June 8, 2010	Search algorithm update	Named Caffeine, this update is announced on August 10, 2009. It promises faster crawling, expansion of the index, and a near-real-time integration of indexing and ranking. The rollout is made live on June 8, 2010.
2009	October 26	Search category	Google introduces Social Search as a Google Labs feature. The feature is expanded further in late January 2010.
2009	December 7	Search category	Google launches real-time search for real-time Twitter feeds, Google News, and other freshly indexed content.
2010	Late April, early May	Search algorithm update	The update, named May Day, is an algorithm change affecting the long tail. Foreshadowing Google Panda, the update penalizes sites with large amounts of thin content.
2010	September 8	User experience	Google launches Google Instant, described as a search-before-you-type feature: as users are typing, Google predicts the user's whole search query (using the same technology as in Google Suggest, later called the autocomplete feature) and instantaneously shows results for the top prediction. Google claims that this is estimated to save 2–5 seconds per search query. SEO commentators initially believe that this will have a major effect on search engine optimization, but soon revise downward their estimate of the impact.
2010	November 9	User experience	Google launches Instant Previews, a feature where users can view previews of the ranked pages by hovering over the links in the search engine results page.
2010	December 1	Search algorithm update	Google updated its algorithm to penalize websites that provided a bad experience to users. The update is prompted by a November 26 New York Times story about a fraudulent company called DecorMyEyes that used the publicity generated by negative customer reviews to rise in the search engine rankings.
2010	December	Search algorithm update (announcement/confirmation)	Both Google and Microsoft's Bing indicate that they use social signals, including signals from Twitter and Facebook, to rank search results.
2011	January–February	Search algorithm update	Foreshadowing Google Panda, Google penalizes Overstock.com and JCPenney for the use of SEO tactics.
2011	January 28	Search algorithm update	Google launches its Attribution algorithm change to better sieve out websites that scrape content. Matt Cutts claims that slightly over 2% of search queries are affected, but less than 0.5% of results change noticeably.
2011	February 23–24	Search algorithm update	Google launches Google Panda, a major update affecting 12% of search queries. The update continues with the earlier work of cracking down on spam, content farms, scrapers, and websites with a high ad-to-content ratio. The rollout is gradual over several months, and Panda will see many further updates.
2011	March 30	User experience, incorporation of user feedback	Google launches the +1 button so that users can offer feedback on search results. Commentators liken this to the like button seen on Facebook.
2011	April 11	Search algorithm update	Google rolls out Panda to all English queries worldwide (not limited to English-speaking countries) and integrates new signals into its ranking algorithm.
2011	May 9	Search algorithm update	Google rolls out further minor updates to Panda but does not discuss them in detail, saying they are more like Panda 2.1 than Panda 3.0.
2011	June 2	Webmaster tools	Google, Yahoo!, and Microsoft announce Schema.org, a joint initiative that supports a richer range of tags that websites can use to convey better information.
2011	June 21	Search algorithm update	Google rolls out Panda 2.2.
2011	July 23	Search algorithm update	Google rolls out Panda 2.3.
2011	August 12	Search algorithm update	Google rolls out Panda 2.4, making Panda available in all languages around the world, except Chinese, Japanese, and Korean.
2011	August 16	User experience	Google rolls out expanded sitelinks, starting with 12-pack links (but later reducing to 6-pack).
2011	September 15	Webmaster tools	Google rolls out pagination elements for websites to communicate to Google that various webpages are different pages of the same article.
2011	September 30	Search algorithm update	Google rolls out Panda 2.5. Although the specifics of the update are unclear, a few sites gain significantly and a few others lose significantly. Other minor flux updates occur on October 3, October 5 and October 13, and some commentators call these Panda 3.0 and 3.1.
2011	October 18	User experience, SEO data	Google announces that they will start encrypting all search queries for security purposes. This disrupts organic keyword referral data for many websites, making search engine optimization harder.
2011	November 3	Search algorithm update	Google announces a Freshness update that would give priority to fresher, more recent search results, and claims this could affect 35% of search queries. The algorithm largely affects time-sensitive queries. A number of sites gain and many others lose as a result of the update.
2011	November 14	Search algorithm update	Google announces a 10-pack of updates, and says that this begins a series of monthly announcements of packs of updates.
2011	November 18	Search algorithm update	Google releases an allegedly minor Panda update, which SEO commentators label as Panda 3.1, despite the lack of a generally agreed upon update named Panda 3.0.
2012	December 2011-January 2012 (announced January 5)	Search algorithm update, user experience	A 30-change pack of updates, including landing-page quality detection, more relevant site-links, more rich snippets, and related-query improvements.
2012	January 10	Search algorithm update, user experience	Google launches Search Plus Your World, a deep integration of one's social data into search. SEO commentators are critical of how the search results favor Google+ and push it to users, compared to more widely used social networks such as Facebook and Twitter.
2012	January 19	Search algorithm update	Google updates its algorithm to introduce a penalty for websites with too many ads "above the fold". The update has no name, but some SEOs use "Top Heavy" to describe the update.
2012	February 27	Search algorithm update	The update, codenamed Venice, is announced as part of Google's end-of-February 40-pack update. Venice seemed to give substantially increased weightage to local results (location inferred from the user's IP and other signals) for many search queries, such as those looking for businesses of various types in the vicinity. On the same date, Google rolls out Panda 3.3, which it bills as a data refresh rather than an algorithm change.
2012	March 23, April 19, April 27	Search algorithm update	March 23: Google rolls out Panda 3.4, which is claimed to affect 1.6% of search queries. Google quietly rolls out Panda 3.5 (April 19) and Panda 3.6 (April 27), with minimal impact.
2012	April 24	Search algorithm update	Google launches its "Webspam update" which would soon become known as Google Penguin.
2012	May 16	Search algorithm update	Google starts rolling out Knowledge Graph, used by Google internally to store semantic relationships between objects. Google now begins displaying supplemental information about objects related to search queries on the side.
2012	May 25	Search algorithm update	Google rolls out an update of Google Penguin, variously called Penguin 1.1 and Penguin 2.
2012	June–September	Search algorithm update	Google rolls out updates to Google Panda: 3.7 (June 8), 3.8 (June 25), 3.9 (July 24), 3.9.1 (August 20), and 3.9.2 (September 18).
2012	August 10	Search algorithm update	Google announces that it will start penalizing websites with repeat copyright infringements, possibly as measured by DMCA takedown requests. Some SEO commentators call this the Pirate update.
2012	September 27	Search algorithm update	Google rolls out a major update to Google Panda (the update is to the underlying algorithm, rather than merely being a data refresh), that would be dubbed Panda 4.0, but SEO commentators decide to simply call it Panda #20. The change is estimated to have affected 2.4% of search queries.
2012	September 27	Search algorithm update	Google announces changes in the way it handles Exact-Match Domains. The change is estimated to have affected 0.6% of search queries.
2012	October 5	Search algorithm update	Google releases minor tweaks to Penguin, affecting about 0.3% of search queries. SEO commentators call it Penguin #3, following the lead of Panda in ditching the use of 1.x notation in favor of labeling updates by number.
2012-13	November 2012-January 2013	Search algorithm update	Google releases updates to Google Panda: #21 (November 5, affecting 1.1% of queries), #22 (November 21, data refresh only), #23 (December 21, data refresh only, affecting 1.3% of queries), and #24 (January 22, affecting 1.2% of queries).
2012	December 4	Search algorithm update	Google adds Knowledge Graph to non-English queries, and says that the change goes beyond translation and also adds enhanced Knowledge Graph capabilities.
2013	March 13–14	Search algorithm update	Google rolls out Panda #25. Remarks by Matt Cutts at SMX West give people the impression that this is the last update to Panda as a distinct entity and it will thereafter be integrated into the core algorithm. On June 11, 2013, Cutts clarifies that Panda updates roll out over 10-day periods every month and are not continuous.
2013	May 22	Search algorithm update	Google rolls out a new version of Google Penguin that it calls Penguin 2.0, which SEO commentators call Penguin #4.
2013	August 6	User experience	Google adds a new feature called "in-depth articles" in its search results to feature long-form content of long-lasting value.
2013	August 21–22 (approximate date for rollout), September 26 (announcement)	Search algorithm update	Google releases Google Hummingbird, a core algorithm update that may enable more semantic search and more effective use of the Knowledge Graph in the future.
2013	October 4	Search algorithm update	Google announces what it calls Penguin 2.1, its fifth version of Penguin, claiming to affect 1% of searches. The effect seems minor.
2014	May 16	Search algorithm update	Payday Loans 2.0 algorithm change is purely low quality external link related and over-optimization. This specifically goes after high search, spammy queries such as "Payday Loans". Google is trying to devalue sites that perform in link buying and other black hat methods to game the algorithm.
2014	May 20	Search algorithm update	Panda 4.0 is implemented to devalue sites that contained poor / low quality content. This has been an ongoing battle that Google has been chipping away at for years. Google has claimed that the algorithm change has impacted roughly 7.5% of all search queries.
2014	July 3	Team	Matt Cutts, a Distinguished Engineer at Google who has been heading the web spam team since 2004, goes on leave till October. He later extends his leave through 2015.
2014	July 24	Search algorithm update	Google announces the rollout of Google Pigeon, a major update to its search algorithm for "local" searches such as searches related to events or businesses near one. The Pigeon update gives more weight to various search signals to deliver more relevant local results.
2014	August 6	Search algorithm update	Google announces search results will give preference to sites using HTTP Secure and SSL encryption. This added ranking signal would be a "lightweight" ranking boost.
2014	August 28	User experience	Google Authorship is removed completely from search results, as already in December 2013 it reduced number of images showing in SERP's. Now it has totally gone to extinction due to lower adaptation rate by authors, to reduce mobile bandwidth and to improve user experience.
2014	September 23 (rollout begins), September 25 (announcement)	Search algorithm update	Google announces that a significant update to Google Panda is rolling out over the next few weeks. The update is dubbed Panda 4.1. An analysis reveals that the update was heavy on attacking affiliate marketing, keyword stuffing, security warnings, and deception.
2014	October 17	Search algorithm update	Penguin 3.0 is implemented as a refresh to re-evaluate sites demoted in the last update due to webspam tactics and demote sites using black hat SEO tactics. This refresh is rolled out globally over several weeks impacting roughly 1% of English-language queries.
2014	October 21	Search algorithm update	Pirate 2.0 update dubbed by SEO commentators following the similar update in 2012 which penalized sites deemed as violators of copyright laws. This refresh targets a relatively small number of known sites causing dramatic drops in ranking. In tandem with this Google introduces a new Ad Format for queries where people may be searching for copyrighted media, requiring publishers to purchase ads to promote original content over the unauthorized copies.
2014	December 10	Search algorithm update	Google announces that Google Penguin will switch to continuous updates, also known as "Penguin Everflux".
2014	December 22	Search algorithm update	Google Pigeon, the local search algorithm update, is rolled out to the United Kingdom, Canada, and Australia.
2015	February 4	Search algorithm update	Many independent sources report significant fluctuations in Google Search results, but Google does not officially confirm any changes.
2015	April 21 (pre-announced February 26)	User experience, search algorithm update (mobile usability)	On January 19, 2015, Google sends emails to webmasters about mobile usability issues on the websites, leading people to speculate that a major mobile usability update for search rankings is underway. On February 26, 2015, Google announces that demotion of mobile-unfriendly sites for searches on mobile devices will commence on April 21, 2015.
2015	May 3	Search algorithm update	Google says it has made a core algorithm change impacting "quality signals". Before the official announcement, commentators had dubbed the changes as "Phantom 2".
2015	July 17	Search algorithm update	Google announces an update to Google Panda, dubbed as Panda 4.2 by commentators. Google says that the change affects between 2% and 3% of search queries. Search engine commentators do not notice any sharp changes to search traffic, and expect the changes to be rolled in gradually. By September, it appears that many websites that had seen gains due to Panda 4.2 are seeing those gains reversed.
2015	October 26	Search algorithm update (announcement/confirmation)	Google announces that RankBrain, a machine learning-based engine (using neural networks), has been the third most influential factor in its search rankings for the last few months. The actual rollout date is not confirmed, but commentators pin the launch time to Spring 2015. It is most useful for new search queries, that account for about 15% of search queries.
2016	February 3	Team	Amit Singhal steps down from his position as Vice President of Search at Google after 15 years in that role. He is replaced by John Giannandrea who works in artificial intelligence at Alphabet, Google's parent company.
2016	February 18 and 23	Advertising	Google makes changes to Google AdWords, removing right-column ads and rolling out 4-ad top blocks on searches with commercial intent. The change has implications on organic search CTRs for such searches, since it pushes the organic search results further down the page, potentially reducing organic search CTRs. Up to three additional ads may be shown below the 10 organic search results, and additional ads may be shown on the second page.
2016	May 12 (announced March 16)	User experience, search algorithm update (mobile usability)	Google rolls out a ranking signal boost to benefit mobile-friendly websites on mobile devices. This is the second update of this sort, with the previous update in April 2015.
2016	September 27 (announced September 23)	Penguin 4.0	After almost two years of waiting, Google finally announced a major Penguin update. They suggested the new Penguin is now real-time and baked into the "core" algorithm. The rollout of the new, "gentler" Penguin algorithm, which devalues bad links instead of penalizing sites.
2017	January 10	Intrusive Interstitial Penalty	Google started rolling out a penalty to punish aggressive interstitials and pop-ups that might damage the mobile user experience. Google also provided a rare warning of this update five months in advance.
2018	March 8	Core Update "Brackets"	Google Made a core update into their algorithm this updated was termed as "Brackets" by Glenn Gabe. This update effected the search ranks to improve it further.
2019	December 9	BERT - Update	In October Google updated its algorithm to support BERT - NLP model. This update helps google to improve the interpretation of natural languages. In December Google extended the BERT update internationally into 70 languages. They confirmed that this algorithm update was rolled out to 70 languages
2021	November 30 (rollout begins) - December 8	Vicinity Update	The Vicinity Update is the biggest update to local SERPs since 2017. This algorithm update made it so that smaller businesses that are closer to the searcher will show up as a search result, rather than only the dominant, larger businesses that are farther away.
2022	May 25 (rollout begins) - June 9	May 2022 Core Update	The May 2022 Core Update was shown to negatively affect the rankings for most news and media publishers, especially generalist news sites that cover a variety of topics. Reference sites like dictionaries, unofficial Wikis, lyric websites, and stock photo sites also saw a drop in rankings, while video site like YouTube, TikTok, Disney+, Hulu, and Twitch saw the largest gains in ranking.
2022	Aug 25	Helpful Content Update	The August 2022 Helpful Content update completed its rollout on September 9. The target of the update was, "content that seems to have been primarily created for ranking well in search engines rather than to help or inform people."
2022	Sep 12	September 2022 Core Update	The update took 14 days. Volatility was lower than many prior similar updates.
2022	Dec 5	December 2022 Helpful Content Update	The update took 38 days to roll out. It reportedly improves Google's classifier, and works across all content and all languages.
2023	Mar 15	March 2023 Core Update	The March 2023 Core Update caused a larger spike in volatility that the September Update. According to Semrush, the largest impacted sectors were Shopping and A&E.
2023	Aug 22	August 2023 Core Update	The update took 16 days to roll out. The biggest gains seemed to be felt by UGC and Reddit, as well as gains from site showing evidence of experience in the subject.
2023	Sep 14	September 2023 Helpful Content Update	This update contained important changes to how sites are ranked including demoting third-party content hosted on sub-domains, and loosening the guidelines around AI-generated content being devalued.
2023	Oct 4	October 2023 Spam Update	Enhanced coverage for more languages and additional types of spam.
2023	Oct 5	October 2023 Core Update	The rollout took 14 days. There was high volatility reported by many of the SEO ranking tools.
2023	Nov 2	November 2023 Core Update	The second core update in as many months is a rare occurrence.
2024	Mar 5	March 2024 Core Update	This update combines Helpful Content Updates in with the core update and includes efforts against scaled content abuse, site reputation abuse and expired domain abuse.
2024	August 15	August 2024 Core Update	This update rolled out over 19 days.
2024	November 11	November 2024 Core Update	This update rolled out over 23 days.
2024	December 12	December 2024 Core Update	This update rolled out over 6 days.
2025	March 13	March 2025 Core Update	This update rolled out over 14 days, and completed on March 27.
2025	June 30	June 2025 Core Update	This update rolled out over 18 days, and compled on July 17. During this update, partial recoveries form the September 2023 Helpful Content Update were reported.
2025	August 26	August 2025 Spam Update	This update rolled out over 16 days and completed on September 21.
2025	December 11	December 2025 Core Update	This update rolled out over 18 days and completed on December 29.
2026	February 5	February 2026 Discover	This update rolled out over 21 days and completed on February 27.
2026	February 24	Serving issue	Google announced it was affected by a serving issue for 15 minutes, between 22:33 PST and 22:34 PST on February 24, 2026. Serving issues are when Google is unable to show some or all search results.
2026	March 24	March 2026 Spam Update	This update rolled out in less than one day and completed on March 25.
2026	March 27	March 2026 Core Update	This update rolled out in 12 days and completed on April 8.
2026	May 21	May 2026 Core Update	This update was released on 21 May 2026 and rolled out in 12 days.
2026	June 24	June 2026 Spam Update	This update rolled out in 2 days and completed on June 26.

== See also ==
- Timeline of web search engines
