= Google Penguin =

Google search engine algorithm update

Google Penguin is a codename for a Google algorithm update that was first announced on April 24, 2012. The update was aimed at decreasing search engine rankings of websites that violate Google's Webmaster Guidelines by using now declared Grey Hat SEM techniques involved in increasing artificially the ranking of a webpage by manipulating the number of links pointing to the page. Such tactics are commonly described as link schemes. According to Google's John Mueller, as of 2013, Google announced all updates to the Penguin filter to the public.

== Effect on search results ==
By Google's estimates, Penguin affected approximately 3.1% of search queries in English, about 3% of queries in languages like German, Chinese, and Arabic, and an even greater percentage of them in "highly spammed" languages. On May 25, 2012, Google unveiled another Penguin update, called Penguin 1.1. This update, according to Matt Cutts, former head of webspam at Google, was supposed to affect less than one-tenth of a percent of English searches. The guiding principle for the update was to penalize websites that were using manipulative techniques to achieve high rankings. Pre-Penguin sites commonly used negative link building techniques to rank highly and get traffic. Once Penguin was rolled out, it meant that content was key, and those with great content would be recognised and those with little or spammy content would be penalised and receive no ranking benefits. The purpose according to Google was to catch excessive spammers. Allegedly, few websites lost search rankings on Google for specific keywords during the Panda and Penguin rollouts. Google specifically mentions that doorway pages, which are only built to attract search engine traffic, are against their webmaster guidelines.

In January 2012, the so-called Page Layout Algorithm Update (also known as the Top Heavy Update) was released, which targeted websites with too many ads, or too little content above the fold.

Penguin 3 was released October 5, 2012, and affected 0.3% of queries. Penguin 4 (also known as Penguin 2.0) was released on May 22, 2013, and affected 2.3% of queries. Penguin 5 (also known as Penguin 2.1) was released on October 4, 2013, affected around 1% of queries, and has been the most recent of the Google Penguin algorithm updates.

Google was reported to have released Penguin 3.0 on October 18, 2014.

On October 21, 2014, Google's Pierre Farr confirmed that Penguin 3.0 was an algorithm "refresh", with no new signals added.

On April 7, 2015, Google's John Mueller said in a Google+ hangout that both Penguin and Panda "currently are not updating the data regularly" and that updates must be pushed out manually. This confirms that the algorithm is not updated continuously which was believed to be the case earlier on in the year.

The strategic goal that Panda, Penguin, and the page layout update share is to display higher quality websites at the top of Google's search results. However, sites that were downranked as the result of these updates have different sets of characteristics. The main target of Google Penguin is to focus on The so-called "black-hat" link-building strategies, such as link buying, link farming, automated links, PBNs, and others.

In a Google+ Hangout on April 15, 2016, John Mueller said "I am pretty sure when we start rolling out [Penguin] we will have a message to kind of post but at the moment I don't have anything specific to kind of announce."

=== Penguin 4.0 (7th Penguin update) ===
On September 23, 2016 Google announced that Google Penguin was now part of the core algorithm meaning that it updates in real time. Hence there will no longer be announcements by Google relating to future refreshes. Real-time also means that websites are evaluated in real-time and rankings impacted in real-time. During the last years webmasters instead always had to wait for the roll-out of the next update to get out of a Penguin penalty. Also, Google Penguin 4.0 is more granular as opposed to previous updates, since it may affect a website on a URL-basis as opposed to always affecting a whole website. Finally, Penguin 4.0 differs from previous Penguin versions since it does not demote a web site when it finds bad links. Instead it discounts the links, meaning it ignores them and they no longer count toward the website's ranking. As a result of this, there is less need to use the disavow file. Google uses both algorithm and human reviewers to identify links that are unnatural (artificial), manipulative or deceptive and includes these in its Manual Actions report for websites.

== Google's Penguin feedback form ==
Two days after the Penguin update was released Google prepared a feedback form, designed for two categories of users: those who want to report web spam that still ranks highly after the search algorithm change, and those who think that their site got unfairly hit by the update. Google also has a reconsideration form through Google Webmaster Tools.

In January 2015, Google's John Mueller said that a Penguin penalty can be removed by simply building good links. The usual process is to remove bad links manually or by using Google's Disavow tool and then filing a reconsideration request. Mueller elaborated on this by saying the algorithm looks at the percentage of good links versus bad links, so by building more good links it may tip the algorithm in your favor which would lead to recovery.

== Confirmed Penguin updates ==
- Penguin 1 on April 24, 2012 (impacting around 3.1% of queries)
- Penguin 2 on May 26, 2012 (impacting less than 0.1%)
- Penguin 3 on October 5, 2012 (impacting around 0.3% of queries)
- Penguin 4 (also known as Penguin 2.0) on May 22, 2013 (impacting 2.3% of queries)
- Penguin 5 (also known as Penguin 2.1) on October 4, 2013 (impacting around 1% of queries)
- Penguin 6 (also known as Penguin 3.0) on October 17, 2014 (impacting less than 1% English queries). On December 1, 2014 Google confirmed that the update was still rolling out with webmasters continuing to report significant fluctuations.
- Penguin 7 (also known as Penguin 4.0) on September 23, 2016

== See also ==
- Google Panda
- Google penalty
- Google Hummingbird
- RankBrain
- Mobilegeddon
- PageRank
- Google Pigeon
