= Traffic Power =

Traffic Power was a Las Vegas, Nevada search engine optimization company that engaged in black hat techniques. These were spamdexing practices that violated Google's webmaster guidelines. As a result, some Traffic Power clients have been banned from Google's organic search results.

According to a Wall Street Journal profile of the company, Traffic Power used high-risk techniques and failed to disclose those risks to its clients. Wired reported that Traffic Power sued blogger Aaron Wall and the website Traffic Power Sucks for stating that they were banned. Google software engineer Matt Cutts later confirmed that Google did in fact ban Traffic Power and some of its clients.

In January 2009 Traffic Power CEO Matt Marlon was jailed on accusations of fraud related to a foreclosure scam.
