= White fonting =

Hiding text in a document

White fonting is the practice of inserting hidden keywords into the body of an electronic document, in order to influence the actions of a search program reviewing that document. The name white fonting comes from the practice of adding keywords to a webpage, using a white font on a white background, in an effort to hide the additional keywords from sight.

White fonting can be used as a search engine optimization (SEO) technique in webpages, by inserting the same keyword multiple times, to create a higher ranking in search engine results where Keyword density is a factor. White fonting can also add unrelated, but often searched, keywords to a webpage in order to gain additional traffic.

White fonting is considered to be an unethical search engine optimization technique, because pages containing white fonting are not indexed and ranked on the basis of page content viewable by human readers. Sites perceived to contain hidden text and links that are deceptive in intent, may be removed from search engine listings such as Google, and will not appear in search results pages.

White fonting can also be used to boost the visibility of other electronic documents evaluated by search engines or automated tracking software, such as resumes or reports.

== See also ==
- Keyword stuffing
- Doorway pages
- Spamdexing
