= Magsformiles =

MagsforMiles, a program run by CAP Systems, allows people to redeem frequent flyer miles for magazine subscriptions. Members of frequent flyer programs with an active, positive mileage balance may receive direct mail informing them of the opportunity to redeem their miles for magazines. Opportunities to redeem miles for magazines are also available on Airline websites.

As of November 2024, Magsformiles is no longer in operation. The web site now points to another site focused on paid magazine subscriptions.

== Available subscriptions ==
As of 2023, the selection is fairly small and includes Barron's, Whiskey Advocate, Cigar Aficionado, Wine Spectator, and Midwest Living, among others.

== Current partners ==
CAP Systems works with many major United States domestic airlines, including Delta Air Lines, United Airlines, American Airlines, Hawaiian Airlines, Frontier Airlines, and others.

== Criticism ==
Mark Dominiak of TelevisionWeek had a bad experience in 2006, never receiving the promised magazines, and by the time he realized it his miles had expired.

Google SEO expert Matt Cutts had a similar experience, of the eight magazines and newspapers Cutts tried to order, he received zero. Instead, eight different times he was told that an 'overwhelming response' meant that title wasn't available. However, a week later, Cutts was contacted by both US Airways and MagsforMiles, at which time Cutts was informed that he had not updated his frequent flyer profile information after moving from NC to CA. This caused him to not receive the magazines he ordered.
