= Google Pigeon =

Google's local search algorithm update

Google Pigeon is the code name given to one of Google's local search algorithm updates. This update was released on July 24, 2014. It is aimed to increase the ranking of local listings in a search.

The changes will also affect the search results shown in Google Maps along with the regular Google search results. As of the initial release date, it was released in US English and was intended to shortly be released in other languages and locations. This update provides the results based on the user location and the listing available in the local directory.

== Effect on search results ==
The purpose of Pigeon is to provide preference to local search results. On the day of release, it received mixed responses from webmasters. Some complained about the ranking being decreased whereas others reported improvement in the search rankings. As per the webmasters' understanding, this update has location and distance as key parts of the search strategy. The local directory listings are getting preferences in web results.

== What's new ==
To improve the quality of local searches and provide more relevant results to the user, Google relies on factors such as location and distance. This update alters the local listings in the search results; along with this, the local directory sites are given preference.

== See also ==
- Local search (Internet)
- Google Hummingbird
- Google Panda
- Google Penguin
- Timeline of Google Search
