= Sandbox effect =

Phenomenon possibly affecting search engine rankings

The sandbox effect (or sandboxing) is a theory about the way Google ranks web pages in its index. Its possible existence has been written about since 2004, but not confirmed, with several statements to the contrary.

== Description ==
According to the theory of the sandbox effect, links that may normally be weighted by Google's ranking algorithm but don't improve the position of a webpage in Google's index, could be subjected to filtering to prevent their full impact. Some observations have suggested that two important factors causing this filter are the active age of a domain and the competitiveness of the keywords used in links.

Active age of a domain should not be confused with the date of registration on a domain's WHOIS record, but instead refers to the time when Google first indexed pages on the domain. Keyword competitiveness refers to the search frequency of a word on Google search, with observation suggesting that the higher the search frequency of a word, the more likely the sandbox filter effect will come into play.

While the presence of the Google sandbox has long been debated, Google has made no direct disclosure. However, as the sandbox effect almost certainly refers to a set of filters in play for anti-spam purposes, it is unlikely Google would ever provide details on the matter. However, in one instance, Google's John Mueller did mention that "it can take a bit of time for search engines to catch up with your content, and to learn to treat it appropriately. It's one thing to have a fantastic website. Still, search engines generally need a bit more to be able to confirm that and to rank your site—your content—appropriately". This could be understood as the cause for the sandbox effect.

Google has long been aware that its historical use of links as a "vote" for ranking web documents can be subject to manipulation and stated such in its original IPO documentation. Over the years, Google has filed a number of patents that seek to qualify or minimise the impact of such manipulation, which Google terms as "link spam".

Link spam is primarily driven by search engine optimizers, who attempt to manipulate Google's page ranking by creating many inbound links to a new website from other websites they own. Some SEO experts also claim that the sandbox only applies to highly competitive or broad keyword phrases and can be counteracted by targeting narrow or so-called long-tail phrases.

== History of penalties ==
Google has been updating its algorithm for as long as it has been fighting the manipulation of organic search results. However, until May 10, 2012, when Google launched the Google Penguin update, many people wrongly believed low-quality backlinks would not negatively affect a site ranking; Google had been applying such link-based penalties for many years but not made public how the company approached and dealt with what they called "link spam". Since then, there has been a much wider acknowledgment of the dangers of bad SEO and forensic analysis of backlinks to ensure no harmful links. As a result, the algorithm penalised Google's own products too. A well-known example is Google Chrome, which was penalised for purchasing links to boost the web browser's results.

== Link-based penalties ==
Penalties are generally caused by manipulative backlinks intended to favor particular companies in the search results. By adding such links, companies break Google's terms and conditions. When Google discovers such links, it imposes penalties to discourage other companies from following this practice and to remove any gains that may have been enjoyed from such links. Google also penalizes those who took part in the manipulation and helped other companies by linking to them. These types of companies are often low-quality directories that list a link to a company website with manipulative anchor text for a fee. Google argues that such pages offer no value to the Internet and are often deindexed. Such links are often referred to as paid links.

== Common forms of links spam ==
=== Paid links ===
Paid links are links that people place on their site for a fee, believing that this will positively impact the search results. The practice of paid links was prevalent before the Penguin update when companies believed they could add any type of link with impunity since Google claimed prior that they ignored these links instead of penalizing websites. To comply with Google's recent TOS, applying the nofollow attribute to paid advertisement links is imperative. Businesses that buy backlinks from low-quality sites attract Google penalties.

=== Comment spam ===
These are links left in the comments of articles that are impossible to remove. As this practice became widespread, Google launched a feature to help curb such practices. The nofollow tag tells search engines not to trust such links.

=== Blog networks ===
Blog networks are sometimes thousands of blogs that appear unconnected, which link out to those prepared to pay for such links. Google has typically targeted blog networks and once detecting them has penalized thousands of sites that gained benefits.

== Dealing with a penalty ==
Google has encouraged companies to reform their bad practices and as a result, demand that efforts be taken to remove manipulative links. Google launched the Disavow tool on 16 October 2012 so that people could report the bad links they had. The Disavow tool was launched mainly in response to many reports of negative SEO, where companies were being targeted with manipulative links by competitors knowing full well that they would be penalized. There has been some controversy over whether the Disavow tool has any effect when manipulation has taken place over many years. At the same time, some anecdotal case studies have been presented, which suggest that the tool is effective and that former ranking positions can be restored.

== Negative SEO ==
Negative SEO started to occur following the Penguin update when it became common knowledge that Google would apply penalties for manipulative links, Such practices as negative SEO led companies to diligently monitor their backlinks to ensure they are not being targeted by hostile competitors through negative SEO services.

In the US and UK, these types of activities by competitors attempting to sabotage a website's rankings are considered to be illegal.

== Notable penalties ==
- BeatThatQuote.com – On March 7, 2011, Google purchased BeatThatQuote.com for £37.7 million and, within the same date, penalized BeatThatQuote.com.
- BMW – On February 6, 2006, Google penalized BMW.de for using doorway pages and dropped the site's PageRank to 0.
- Google Chrome – In January 2012, Google's webspam team penalized the Chrome browser's homepage for manipulating PageRank with purchased blog posts. The penalty dropped Chrome's homepage's PageRank from 9 to 7 and knocked Chrome off the first page for important keywords such as "browser."
- Expedia – In January 2014, Expedia dropped 25% in search visibility, which resulted in Expedia shares dropping 4.5%.
- Overstock.com – During fiscal year 2011, Overstock.com attributed a decrease from $1.08 billion to $1.05 billion in revenue to Google penalties.
- Rap Genius – On December 25, 2013, Google penalized Rap Genius for 10 days. The result was a drop of about 700,000 unique visitors per day.
- BBC – In March 2013, the BBC faced penalties for unnatural links on a specific page. Google downgraded the page's rankings as a result.

== Reverse sandbox effect ==
A "reverse sandbox" effect is also claimed to exist, whereby new pages with good content, but without inbound links, are temporarily increased in rank — much like the "New Releases" in a book store are displayed more prominently — to encourage the organic building of the World Wide Web.

David George disputes the claim that Google applies sandboxing to all new websites, saying that the claim "doesn't seem to be borne out by experience". He states that he created a new website in October 2004 and had it ranked in the top 20 Google results for a target keyword within one month. He asserts that "no one knows for sure if the Google sandbox exists", and comments that it "seems to fit the observations and experiments of many search engine optimizers". He theorizes that the sandbox "has introduced some hysteresis into the system to restore a bit of sanity to Google's results".

In an interview with the Search Engine Roundtable website, Matt Cutts is reported to have said that some things in the algorithm may be perceived as a sandbox that does not apply to all industries. Jaimie Sirovich and Cristian Darie, authors of Professional Search Engine Optimization with PHP, state that they believe that, while Google does not actually have an explicit "sandbox", the effect itself (however caused) is real.
