= Canonical link =

A canonical link is either

- a canonical link element, an HTML element that helps webmasters prevent duplicate content issues; or
- a function specified in a generalized linear model in statistics; see Generalized_linear_model#Link_function.
