= Keyword density =

Frequency of a keyword in a web page

Keyword density is the percentage of times a keyword or phrase appears on a web page compared to the total number of words on the page. In the context of search engine optimization, keyword density can be used to determine whether a web page is relevant to a specified keyword or keyword phrase.

== History ==
In the late 1990s, the early days of search engines, keyword density was an important factor in page ranking within search results. However, as webmasters (website managers) discovered how to implement optimum keyword density, search engines began giving more weight to other ranking factors.

Today, the overuse of keywords, a practice called keyword stuffing, is more likely to hurt SEO than help it.

By 2022, search engines had begun to favor semantic SEO, meaning they understand synonyms, context, and content themes without requiring high keyword repetition.

== Formula ==
The formula to calculate keyword density on a web page for search engine optimization purposes is $(Nkr / Tkn) * 100$, where Nkr is how many times a specific keyword is repeated, and Tkn is the total words in the analyzed text. The result is the keyword density value. When calculating keyword density, HTML tags and other embedded tags that do not appear in the text of the published page should be ignored.

When calculating the density of a keyword phrase, the formula is $(Nkr * Nwp / Tkn) * 100$, where Nwp is the number of words in the phrase. For example, for a 400-word page about search engine optimization where "search engine optimization" is used four times, the keyword phrase density is (4*3/400)*100 or 3 percent.

From a mathematical viewpoint, the original concept of keyword density refers to the frequency (Nkr) of the appearance of a keyword in a dissertation. A "keyword" consisting of multiple terms, e.g. "blue suede shoes," is an entity in itself. The frequency of the phrase "blue suede shoes" within a dissertation drives the keyphrase density. It is mathematically correct for a 'keyphrase' to be calculated just like the original calculation but considering the word group, "blue suede shoes," as a single appearance, not three:

$\text{Density} = \left( \frac{N_{\text{kr}}}{T_{\text{kn}}} \right) * 100$

Keywords that consist of several words artificially inflate the total word count of the dissertation. The purest mathematical representation should adjust the total word count $T_{\text{kn}}$ lower by removing the excess keyphrase word counts from the total:

$\text{Density} = \left( \frac{N_{\text{kr}}}{T_{\text{kn}} - \left( N_{\text{kr}} \cdot (N_{\text{wp}} - 1) \right)} \right) \times 100$

where $N_{\text{wp}}$ is the number of terms in the keyphrase.

== See also ==
- Online advertising
