= Google Hummingbird =

Search engine algorithm used by Google

Hummingbird is the codename given to a significant algorithm change in Google Search in 2013. "Hummingbird" places greater emphasis on natural language queries, considering context and meaning over individual keywords. Its name was derived from the speed and accuracy of the hummingbird. The change was announced on September 26, 2013, having already been in use for a month. It also looks deeper at content on individual pages of a website, with improved ability to link users to the most appropriate page on a website rather than just a website's homepage.

The upgrade marked the most significant change to Google search in years, with more "human" search interactions and a much heavier focus on conversation and meaning. Thus, web developers and writers were encouraged to optimize their sites with natural writing rather than forced keywords, and make effective use of technical web development for on-site navigation.

== History ==
Google announced "Hummingbird", a new search algorithm, at a September 2013 press event, having already used the algorithm for approximately one month prior to announcement.

== Features ==
The "Hummingbird" update was the first major update to Google's search algorithm since the 2010 "Caffeine" search architecture upgrade, but even that was limited primarily to improving the indexing of information rather than sorting through information. Amit Singhal, then-search chief at Google, told Search Engine Land that "Hummingbird" was the most dramatic change of the algorithm since 2001, when he first joined Google. Unlike previous search algorithms, which would focus on each individual word in the search query, "Hummingbird" considers the context of the different words together, with the goal that pages matching the meaning do better, rather than pages matching just a few words. The name is derived from the speed and accuracy of the hummingbird.

"Hummingbird" is aimed at making interactions more human, in the sense that the search engine is capable of understanding the concepts and relationships between keywords. It places greater emphasis on page content, making search results more relevant, and looks at the authority of a page, and in some cases the page author, to determine the importance of a website. It uses this information to better lead users to a specific page on a website rather than the standard website homepage.

=== Search engine optimization changes ===
Search engine optimization changed with the addition of "Hummingbird", with web developers and writers encouraged to use natural language when writing on their websites rather than using forced keywords. They were also advised to make effective use of technical website features, such as page linking, on-page elements including title tags, URL addresses and HTML tags, as well as writing high-quality, relevant content without duplication. While keywords within the query still continue to be important, "Hummingbird" adds more strength to long-tailed keywords, effectively catering to the optimization of content rather than just keywords. The use of synonyms has also been optimized; instead of listing results with exact phrases or keywords, Google shows more theme-related results.

== See also ==
- Google Panda, 2011
- Google penalty
- Google Penguin
- Google Pigeon
- Google Knowledge Graph
- PageRank
- Semantic analysis (machine learning)
- RankBrain
- Mobilegeddon
- Search engine indexing
