= Rowan County Senior High School =

Location
- 499 Viking Drive; Morehead, Rowan, Kentucky 40351; United States; 38.2044°N 83.4795°W

Information
- School type: Public
- Established: 1961
- Superintendent: Michael Rowe
- Principal: Lori Staggs
- Teaching staff: 47.50 (FTE)
- Grades: 9-12
- Student to teacher ratio: 21.45
- Colors: Green and white
- Sports: Basketball, Football, Baseball, Tennis, Track and field, Cross Country, Volleyball, Bowling, Marching Band, Wrestling, Swim, and Archery
- Mascot: the Viking
- Team name: Vikings
- National ranking: 6,206
- Newspaper: Viking Voice
- Website: Rowan County Senior High School

Rowan County Senior High School (RCSHS) is located in Morehead, Kentucky, United States. The enrollment in the 2018–19 school year was 890 students. The mascot is the Viking and the school colors are green and white. Lori Staggs is the current principal.

== Basketball ==
In 2011, the boys' basketball team played in the championship game of the 2011 PNC Bank/Kentucky High School Athletic Association Boys' Sweet Sixteen Basketball Tournament. Although the Rowan Vikings lost the game in double overtime, a resolution was created by the Senate of the General Assembly of the Commonwealth of Kentucky to honor the team, their coach, their school and their community for their efforts in "one of the best high school basketball games this Commonwealth has ever seen."

== Notable alumni ==
- Matt Cutts, director of engineering for the United States Digital Service, former head of the web spam team at Google
- Sam Holbrook, MLB umpire
- Joe Magrane, MLB player
