= Competitor backlinking =

Competitor backlinking is a search engine optimization strategy that involves analyzing the backlinks of competing websites within a vertical search. The practice is commonly used to analyze backlink profiles for competitive research. and to gain an understanding of the link-building strategies used by business competitors.

Competitor backlinking can provide insights into the types of links that may contribute to higher search engine rankings. The number and quality of backlinks may be influential, and they are part of a broader array of factors that search engines use to rank websites, including content quality, user experience, technical SEO, and keyword relevance. These factors include content quality, keyword relevance, user engagement, and overall site architecture. Obtaining a similar number or quality of backlinks as a competitor does not guarantee similar search engine rankings. Sector-level comparisons by more sophisticated consultants or communications firms often also attempt to use dwell time statistics or other valuable proprietary SEO data to understand user engagement as well as backlink prevalence.
