= Website promotion =

Optimization Of Website

Website promotion is a process used by webmasters to improve content and increase exposure of a website to bring more visitors. Many techniques such as search engine optimization and search engine submission are used to increase a site's traffic once content is developed.

Another key factor is strong website design, with studies showing that design is just as important as content in grabbing users attention

With the rise in popularity of social media platforms, many webmasters have moved to platforms like Facebook, Twitter, LinkedIn and Instagram for viral marketing. By sharing interesting content, webmasters hope that some of the audience will visit the website. Examples of viral content are infographics and memes.

Webmasters often hire outsourced or offshore firms to perform website promotion for them, many of whom provide "low-quality, assembly-line link building".

== See also ==
- Search engine marketing
- Guerrilla marketing
- Conversion rate optimization
- Cross-device tracking
