= Geotargeting =

Website content based on a visitor's location

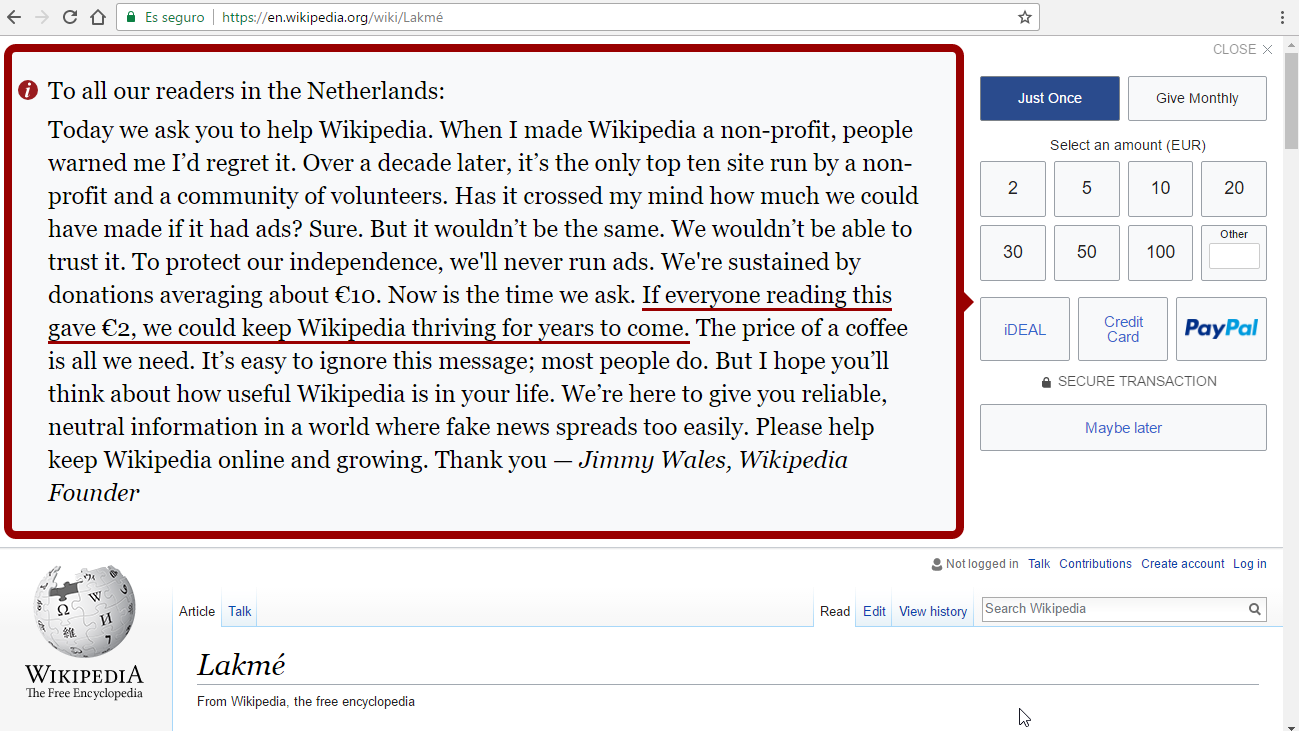
Wikimedia banner as example of geotargeting for its donation drive, here specifically targeting Netherlands.

In geomarketing and internet marketing, geotargeting is the method of delivering different content to visitors based on their geolocation. This includes country, region/state, city, metro code/zip code, organization, IP address, ISP, or other criteria. A common usage of geotargeting is found in online advertising, as well as internet television with sites such as iPlayer and Hulu. In these circumstances, content is often restricted to users geolocated in specific countries; this approach serves as a means of implementing digital rights management. Use of proxy servers and virtual private networks may give a false location.

== Geographical information provided by the visitor ==
In geotargeting with geolocation software, the geolocation is based on geographical and other personal information that is provided by the visitor or others.

=== Content by choice ===
Some websites, for example FedEx and UPS, utilize geotargeting by giving users the choice to select their country location. The user is then presented with different site or article content depending on their selection.

=== Automated different content ===
In internet marketing and geomarketing, the delivery of different content based on the geographical geolocation and other personal information is automated. A good example is the Ace Hardware website at www.acehardware.com. The company utilizes geolocation software to power the “My Local Ace” section of its website. Based on a site visitor's location, the website's online locator service can show the visitor how many stores are in their area, as well as a city-level locator map to help the customer find the store closest to their address. Different offers may be presented depending on local conditions, e.g. weather, local competitors, local trends, etc.

== IP spidering ==
The automated discovery of user person/organisation/city-level geolocation information based on IP addresses by traceroute, pings, and a combination of other tools and methods is far more advanced.

It is dependent on the pre-analysis of the entire IP address space. There are more than 4 billion possible IPv4 addresses, and detailed analysis of each of them is a Herculean task, especially in light of the fact that IP addresses are constantly being assigned, allocated, reallocated, moved, and changed due to routers being moved, enterprises being assigned IP addresses or moving, and networks being built or changed. In order to keep up with these changes, complex algorithms, bandwidth measurement and mapping technology, and finely tuned delivery mechanisms are necessary. Once all of the IP space is analyzed, each address must be periodically updated to reflect changes in the IP address information without invading a user's privacy. This process is similar in scale to the task of Web spidering.

== IP delivery in SEO ==
Websites utilize IP delivery for search engine optimization (SEO) in a method called cloaking. SEOs maintain a list of IP addresses that are known to be servers owned by a search engine and used to run their crawler applications (spiders). The visitor's IP address is compared to the list, and if it is determined to be a search engine spider, it is presented with different web page content from human visitors. Cloaking is against most search engines' webmaster guidelines.

Although search engine guidelines imply that any type of cloaking is bad, there are instances when the practice may be legitimate. The subject is very controversial and continues to be debated by SEO experts.

"Cloaking" via IP delivery is different from cloaking via "user agent". While IP address spoofing is harder and more reliable than user-agent spoofing, it is also harder to keep the list of IP addresses used by search engines for their crawlers up-to-date. An outdated list of active crawler IP addresses enables the search engines to detect cloaking and may result in a removal of the site from the search engine's index.

== Common uses ==
- Content Localization: Webmasters who want to serve local content on a global domain.
- Copyright owners and delivery networks restrict streams based on the geographical information.
- Pay per click advertisement to have ads appear only to users who live in selected locations.
- Display advertisement where banner or other multimedia ads are displayed based on the visitor's location.
- The use of connection speed data correlated to IP address to tailor content.
- Online analytics identify live the correlation of city-level geography, connection speed data, and certain demographic data to IP addresses.
- Enhanced performance networks provide superior customer targeting to advertisers.
- Fraud prevention identifies suspicious payment transactions live by correlations between IP address and additional information (billing records, email header).
- City advertising by advertising on web sites with extensive content related to particular cities. Such websites can connect large city audiences with products/services for sale in those cities. Surfers searching for information about particular cities find adverts on such web sites as a result of city name related searches rather than product/service keyword searches. In this way businesses, e.g. shops, restaurants, can advertise and reach out to consumers located in the real-world localities of their product/service offerings.
- Content based on local time using IP geolocation.
- Use of a content distribution network to serve data from a nearby server.
- Website Personalization, where website content is changed and replaced based on visitor location.
- One-to-one or household IP targeting surfaces display advertisements to individual buildings or homes.
- Content / Ad verification - changing IPs for content compliance or ad verification.

== See also ==
- Digital marketing
