= Google Panda =

Change to Google's search results ranking algorithm

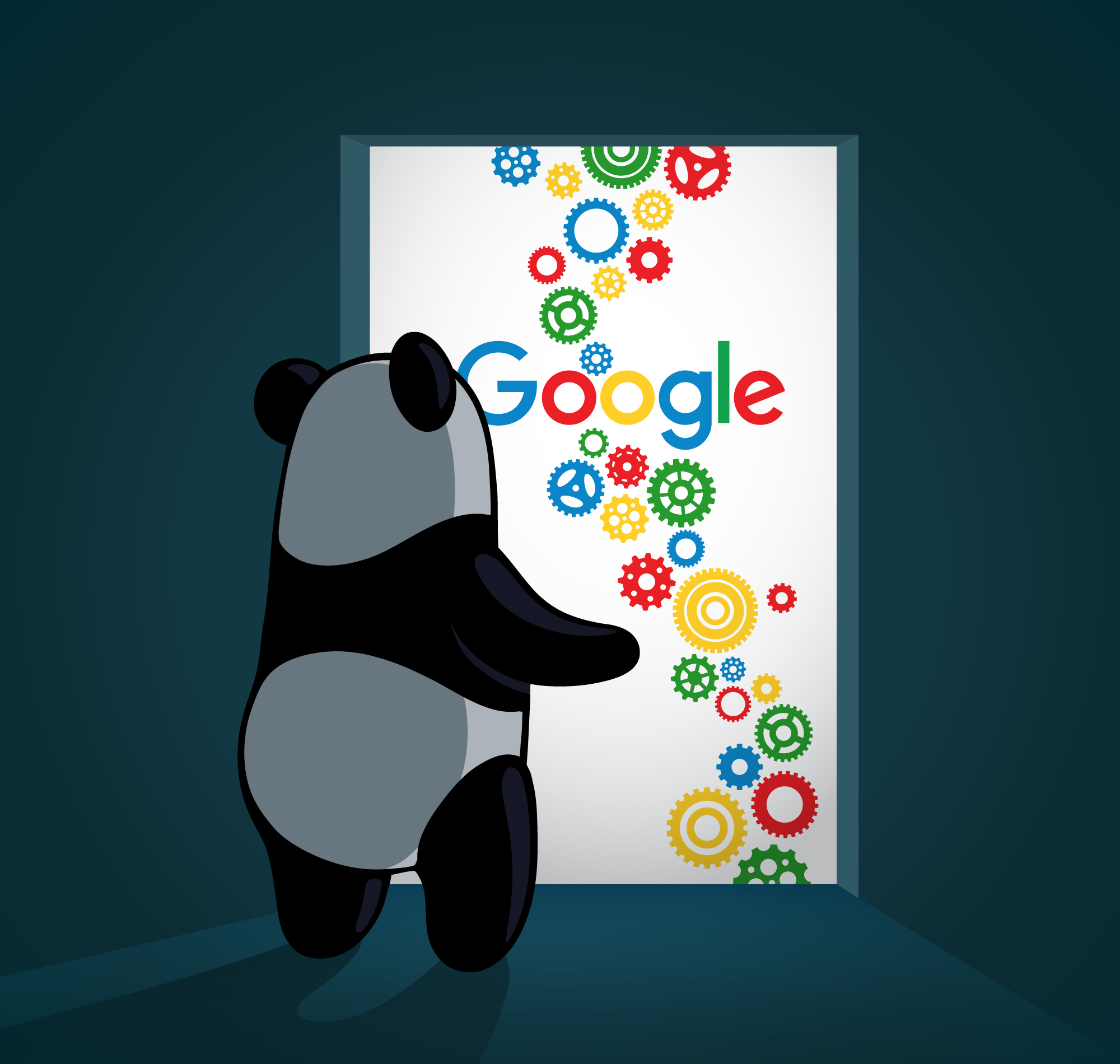

Google Panda is an algorithm used by the Google search engine, introduced in February 2011. The main goal of this algorithm is to improve the quality of search results by lowering the rankings of websites with "low-quality content". Panda is part of Google's broader approach to combat low-quality websites that use manipulative methods to gain higher positions in search engine results.

CNET reported a surge in the rankings of news websites and social networking sites, and a drop in rankings for sites containing large amounts of advertising. This change reportedly affected the rankings of almost 12 percent of all search results. Soon after the Panda rollout, many websites, including Google's webmaster forum, became filled with complaints of scrapers/copyright infringers getting better rankings than sites with original content. At one point, Google publicly asked for data points to help detect scrapers better. In 2016, Matt Cutts, Google's head of webspam at the time of the Panda update, commented that "with Panda, Google took a big enough revenue hit via some partners that Google actually needed to disclose Panda as a material impact on an earnings call. But I believe it was the right decision to launch Panda, both for the long-term trust of our users and for a better ecosystem for publishers."

Google's Panda received several updates after the original rollout in February 2011, and their effect went global in April 2011. To help affected publishers, Google provided an advisory on its blog, thus giving some direction for self-evaluation of a website's quality. Google has provided a list of 23 bullet points on its blog answering the question of "What counts as a high-quality site?" that is supposed to help webmasters "step into Google's mindset". Since 2015, Panda has been incorporated into Google's core algorithm.

The name "Panda" comes from the Google engineer Navneet Panda, who developed the technology that allowed Google to create and implement the algorithm.

== Ranking factors ==
The Google Panda patent (patent 8,682,892), filed on September 28, 2012, and granted on March 25, 2014, states that Panda creates a ratio between a site's inbound links and search queries related to the site's brand. This ratio is then used to create a sitewide modification factor, which is applied to a page based on a search query. If the page does not meet a certain threshold, the modification factor is applied, and the page ranks lower in search engine results.

After the rollout of the Google Panda update, there were significant shifts in search rankings. News and social networking sites saw higher rankings, while heavily-advertised sites dropped, affecting nearly 12% of search results. Panda affects the ranking of an entire site or specific sections of it, rather than just individual pages.

== Updates ==
For the first two years, Google Panda's updates were rolled out about once a month, but Google stated in March 2013 that future updates would be integrated into the algorithm and would therefore be continuous and less noticeable.

On 20 May 2014, the Panda 4.0 update was released. One of the consequences of this update was the decline in rankings of websites that Google considers "low-quality," including content aggregators, news sites (especially in the areas of rumors and gossip), and price comparison websites.

Google released a "slow rollout" of Panda 4.2 starting on July 18, 2015.

== See also ==
- Google Hummingbird
- Google penalty
- Google Penguin
- Search engine optimization (SEO)
- Spamdexing
