= Mobilegeddon =

Google search algorithm update

Mobilegeddon is a name for Google's search engine algorithm update of April 21, 2015. The term was coined by Chuck Price in a post written for Search Engine Watch on March 9, 2015. The term was then adopted by webmasters and web-developers.

The main effect of this update was to give priority to websites that display well on smartphones and other mobile devices. The change did not affect searches made from a desktop computer or a laptop.

Google announced its intention to make the change in February 2015. In addition to their announcement, Google published an article, "Mobile Friendly Sites," on their Google Developers page to help webmasters with the transition. Google claims the transition to mobile-friendly sites was to improve user experience, stating "the desktop version of a site might be difficult to view and use on a mobile device."

The protologism is a blend word of "mobile" and "Armageddon" because the change "could cause massive disruption to page rankings." But, writing for Forbes, Robert Hof says that concerns about the change were "overblown" in part because "Google is providing a test to see if sites look good on smartphones".

Search engine results pages on smartphones now show URLs in "breadcrumb" format, as opposed to the previous explicit format.

== Impact ==
Based on their data set, software company Searchmetrics found that the average loss of rankings for the non-mobile friendly sites measured was 0.21 positions on average. Content marketing company BrightEdge has tracked over 20,000 URLs since the update, and is reporting a 21% decrease in non-mobile-friendly URLs on the first 3 pages of search results. According to Peter J. Meyers, it was "nothing to write home about."

== See also ==
- Mobile web
- Adaptive web design
- Responsive web design
- Search engine optimization
