= Spamdexing =

Deliberate manipulation of search engine indexes

Spamdexing (also known as search engine spam, search engine poisoning, black-hat search engine optimization, search spam or web spam) is the deliberate manipulation of search engine indexes. It involves various methods, such as link building and repeating related or unrelated phrases, to manipulate the relevance or prominence of indexed resources in a manner inconsistent with the purpose of the indexing system.

Spamdexing could be considered a part of search engine optimization, although there are many SEO methods that improve the quality and appearance of the content of websites and serve content useful to many users.

== Overview ==
Search engines use a variety of algorithms to determine relevancy ranking. Some of these include determining whether the search term appears in the body text or URL of a web page. Many search engines check for instances of spamdexing and will remove suspect pages from their indexes. Also, search-engine operators can quickly block the results listing from entire websites that use Spamdexing, perhaps in response to user complaints of false matches. The rise of Spamdexing in the mid-1990s made the leading search engines of the time less useful. Using unethical methods to make websites rank higher in search engine results than they otherwise would is commonly referred to in the SEO (search engine optimization) industry as "black-hat" SEO. These methods are more focused on breaking the search-engine-promotion rules and guidelines. In addition to this, the perpetrators run the risk of their websites being severely penalized by the Google Panda and Google Penguin search-results ranking algorithms.

Common spamdexing techniques can be classified into two broad classes: content spam (term spam) and link spam.

== History ==
The earliest known reference to the term spamdexing is by Eric Convey in his article "Porn sneaks way back on Web", The Boston Herald, May 22, 1996, where he said :

The problem arises when site operators load their Web pages with hundreds of extraneous terms so search engines will list them among legitimate addresses. The process is called "Spamdexing," a combination of spamming—the Internet term for sending users unsolicited information—and "indexing."

Keyword stuffing had been used in the past to obtain top search engine rankings and visibility for particular phrases. This method is outdated and adds no value to rankings today. In particular, Google no longer gives good rankings to pages employing this technique.

Hiding text from the visitor is done in many different ways. Text colored to blend with the background, CSS z-index positioning to place text underneath an image — and therefore out of view of the visitor — and CSS absolute positioning to have the text positioned far from the page center are all common techniques. By 2005, many invisible text techniques were easily detected by major search engines.

"Noscript" tags are another way to place hidden content within a page. While they are a valid optimization method for displaying an alternative representation of scripted content, they may be abused, since search engines may index content that is invisible to most visitors.

In the past, keyword stuffing was considered to be either a white hat or a black hat tactic, depending on the context of the technique, and the opinion of the person judging it. While a great deal of keyword stuffing was employed to aid in Spamdexing, which is of little benefit to the user, keyword stuffing in certain circumstances was not intended to skew results in a deceptive manner. Whether the term carries a pejorative or neutral connotation is dependent on whether the practice is used to pollute the results with pages of little relevance, or to direct traffic to a page of relevance that would have otherwise been de-emphasized due to the search engine's inability to interpret and understand related ideas. This is no longer the case. Search engines now employ themed, related keyword techniques to interpret the intent of the content on a page.

== Content spam ==
These techniques involve altering the logical view that a search engine has over the page's contents. They all aim at variants of the vector space model for information retrieval on text collections.

=== Keyword stuffing ===
Keyword stuffing is a search engine optimization (SEO) technique in which keywords are loaded into a web page's meta tags, visible content, or backlink anchor text in an attempt to gain an unfair rank advantage in search engines. A variant of keyword stuffing is tagging one's own website with another company's trademark. Keyword stuffing may lead to a website being temporarily or permanently banned or penalized on major search engines. The repetition of words in meta tags may explain why many search engines no longer rely on these tags for ranking. Nowadays, search engines focus more on unique, comprehensive, relevant, and helpful content. As a result, keyword stuffing has become largely ineffective, although it is still practiced by some webmasters, particularly on lower-quality or spam-oriented sites.

Many major search engines have implemented algorithms that recognize keyword stuffing, and reduce or eliminate any unfair search advantage that the tactic may have been intended to gain, and oftentimes they will also penalize, demote or remove websites from their indexes that implement keyword stuffing.

Changes and algorithms specifically intended to penalize or ban sites using keyword stuffing include the Google Florida update (November 2003) Google Panda (February 2011) Google Hummingbird (August 2013) and Bing's September 2014 update.

Headlines in online news sites are increasingly packed with just the search-friendly keywords that identify the story. Traditional reporters and editors frown on the practice, but it is effective in optimizing news stories for search.

=== Hidden or invisible text ===
Unrelated hidden text is disguised by making it the same color as the background, using a tiny font size, or hiding it within HTML code such as "no frame" sections, alt attributes, zero-sized DIVs, and "no script" sections. People manually screening red-flagged websites for a search-engine company might temporarily or permanently block an entire website for having invisible text on some of its pages. However, hidden text is not always spamdexing: it can also be used to enhance accessibility.

=== Meta-tag stuffing ===
This involves repeating keywords in the meta tags, and using meta keywords that are unrelated to the site's content. This tactic has been ineffective. Google declared that it doesn't use the keywords meta tag in its online search ranking in September 2009.

=== Doorway pages ===
"Gateway" or doorway pages are low-quality web pages created with very little content, which are instead stuffed with very similar keywords and phrases. They are designed to rank highly within the search results, but serve no purpose to visitors looking for information. A doorway page will generally have "click here to enter" on the page; autoforwarding can also be used for this purpose. In 2006, Google ousted vehicle manufacturer BMW for using "doorway pages" to the company's German site, BMW.de. Google announced that they will inflict a penalty on doorway tactics.

=== Scraper sites ===
Scraper sites are created using various programs designed to "scrape" search-engine results pages or other sources of content and create "content" for a website. The specific presentation of content on these sites is unique, but is merely an amalgamation of content taken from other sources, often without permission. Such websites are generally full of advertising (such as pay-per-click ads), or they redirect the user to other sites. It is even feasible for scraper sites to outrank original websites for their own information and organization names.

=== Article spinning ===
Article spinning involves rewriting existing articles, as opposed to merely scraping content from other sites, to avoid penalties imposed by search engines for duplicate content. This process is undertaken by hired writers or automated using a synonym replacement system, artificial neural networks, or large language models (LLMs).

=== Machine translation ===
Similarly to article spinning, some sites use machine translation to render their content in several languages, with no human editing, resulting in unintelligible texts that nonetheless continue to be indexed by search engines, thereby attracting traffic.

== Link spam ==
Link spam is defined as links between pages that are present for reasons other than merit. Link spam takes advantage of link-based ranking algorithms, which gives websites higher rankings the more other highly ranked websites link to it. These techniques also aim at influencing other link-based ranking techniques such as the HITS algorithm.

=== Link farms ===
Link farms are tightly-knit networks of websites that link to each other for the sole purpose of exploiting the search engine ranking algorithms. These are also known facetiously as mutual admiration societies. Use of links farms has greatly reduced with the launch of Google's first Panda Update in February 2011, which introduced significant improvements in its spam-detection algorithm.

=== Private blog networks ===
Blog networks (PBNs) are a group of authoritative websites used as a source of contextual links that point to the owner's main website to achieve higher search engine ranking. Owners of PBN websites use expired domains or auction domains that have backlinks from high-authority websites. Google targeted and penalized PBN users on several occasions with several massive deindexing campaigns since 2014.

=== Hidden links ===
Putting hyperlinks where visitors will not see them is used to increase link popularity. Highlighted link text can help rank a webpage higher for matching that phrase.

=== Sybil attack ===
A Sybil attack is the forging of multiple identities for malicious intent, named after the famous dissociative identity disorder patient and the book about her that shares her name, "Sybil". A spammer may create multiple web sites at different domain names that all link to each other, such as fake blogs (known as spam blogs).

=== Spam blogs ===
Spam blogs are blogs created solely for commercial promotion and the passage of link authority to target sites. Often these "splogs" are designed in a misleading manner that will give the effect of a legitimate website but upon close inspection will often be written using spinning software or be very poorly written with barely readable content. They are similar in nature to link farms.

=== Guest blog spam ===
Guest blog spam is the process of placing guest blogs on websites for the sole purpose of gaining a link to another website or websites. Unfortunately, these are often confused with legitimate forms of guest blogging with other motives than placing links. This technique was made famous by Matt Cutts, who publicly declared "war" against this form of link spam.

=== Buying expired domains ===
Some link spammers utilize expired domain crawler software or monitor DNS records for domains that will expire soon, then buy them when they expire and replace the pages with links to their pages. However, it is possible but not confirmed that Google resets the link data on expired domains.

Some of these techniques may be applied for creating a Google bomb—that is, to cooperate with other users to boost the ranking of a particular page for a particular query.

=== Using world-writable pages ===
Web sites that can be edited by users can be used by spamdexers to insert links to spam sites if the appropriate anti-spam measures are not taken.

Automated spambots can rapidly make the user-editable portion of a site unusable. Programmers have developed a variety of automated spam prevention techniques to block or at least slow down spambots.

==== Spam in blogs ====
Spam in blogs is the placing or solicitation of links randomly on other sites, placing a desired keyword into the hyperlinked text of the inbound link. Guest books, forums, blogs, and any site that accepts visitors' comments are particular targets and are often victims of drive-by spamming where automated software creates nonsense posts with links that are usually irrelevant and unwanted.

==== Comment spam ====
Comment spam is a form of link spam that has arisen in web pages that allow dynamic user editing such as wikis, blogs, and guestbooks. It can be problematic because agents can be written that automatically randomly select a user edited web page, such as a Wikipedia article, and add spamming links.

==== Wiki spam ====
Wiki spam is when a spammer uses the open editability of wiki systems to place links from the wiki site to the spam site.

==== Referrer log spamming ====
Referrer spam takes place when a spam perpetrator or facilitator accesses a web page (the referee), by following a link from another web page (the referrer), so that the referee is given the address of the referrer by the person's web browser.

Some websites have a referrer log which shows which pages link to that site. By having a robot randomly access many sites enough times, with a message or specific address given as the referrer, that message or Internet address then appears in the referrer log of those sites that have referrer logs. Since some Web search engines base the importance of sites on the number of different sites linking to them, referrer-log spam may increase the search engine rankings of the spammer's sites. Also, site administrators who notice the referrer log entries in their logs may follow the link back to the spammer's referrer page.

==== Countermeasures ====
Because of the large amount of spam posted to user-editable webpages, Google proposed a "nofollow" tag that could be embedded with links. A link-based search engine, such as Google's PageRank system, will not use the link to increase the score of the linked website if the link carries a nofollow tag. This ensures that spamming links to user-editable websites will not raise the sites ranking with search engines. Nofollow is used by several websites.

== Other types ==
=== Mirror websites ===
A mirror site is the hosting of multiple websites with conceptually similar content but using different URLs. Some search engines give a higher rank to results where the keyword searched for appears in the URL.

=== URL redirection ===
URL redirection is the taking of the user to another page without their intervention, e.g., using META refresh tags, Flash, JavaScript, Java or Server side redirects. However, 301 Redirect, or permanent redirect, is not considered as a malicious behavior.

=== Cloaking ===
Cloaking refers to any of several means to serve a page to the search-engine spider that is different from that seen by human users. It can be an attempt to mislead search engines regarding the content on a particular web site. Cloaking, however, can also be used to ethically increase accessibility of a site to users with disabilities or provide human users with content that search engines aren't able to process or parse. It is also used to deliver content based on a user's location; Google itself uses IP delivery, a form of cloaking, to deliver results. Another form of cloaking is code swapping, i.e., optimizing a page for top ranking and then swapping another page in its place once a top ranking is achieved. Google refers to these types of redirects as Sneaky Redirects.

== Countermeasures ==
=== Page omission by search engine ===
If a search engine suspects a page is being spamdexed, they sometimes eliminate the page from search results. They often do this through automatic spam-detecting software

Many search engines allow users to report content that appears as a result of spam. Google cites the reasoning for this as an "attempt to compromise the quality of Google's search results violate our spam policies. These in turn feed the accuracy of the automatic spam-detection software.

=== Page omission by user ===
Users can employ search operators for filtering. For Google, a keyword preceded by "-" (minus) will omit sites that contains the keyword in their pages or in the URL of the pages from search result. As an example, the search "-<unwanted site>" will eliminate sites that contains word "<unwanted site>" in their pages and the pages whose URL contains "<unwanted site>".

Users could also use the Google Chrome extension "Personal Blocklist (by Google)", launched by Google in 2011 as part of countermeasures against content farming. Via the extension, users could block a specific page, or set of pages from appearing in their search results. As of 2021, the original extension appears to be removed, although similar-functioning extensions may be used.

Possible solutions to overcome search-redirection poisoning redirecting to illegal internet pharmacies include notification of operators of vulnerable legitimate domains. Further, manual evaluation of SERPs, previously published link-based and content-based algorithms as well as tailor-made automatic detection and classification engines can be used as benchmarks in the effective identification of pharma scam campaigns.

== See also ==
- Adversarial information retrieval – Information retrieval strategies in datasets
- Cloaking – Search engine optimization technique
- Content farm – Organization that creates web content optimised for views
- Doorway page – Misleading web page
- Hidden text – Invisible text on a computer display
- Search engine indexing – Method for data management – overview of search engine indexing technology
- Link farm – Group of websites that link to each other
- TrustRank – Link analysis algorithm
- Web scraping – Method of extracting data from websites
- Microsoft SmartScreen – Microsoft Windows anti-malware system
- Microsoft Defender Antivirus – Anti-malware software
- Scraper site – Website which copies content from others
- White fonting – Hiding text in a document
