= Doorway page =

Misleading web page

Doorway pages (bridge pages, portal pages, jump pages, gateway pages or entry pages) are web pages that are created for the deliberate manipulation of search engine indexes (spamdexing). A doorway page will affect the index of a search engine by inserting results for particular phrases while sending visitors to a different page. Doorway pages that redirect visitors without their knowledge use some form of cloaking. This usually falls under Black Hat SEO.

If a visitor clicks through to a typical doorway page from a search engine results page, in most cases they will be redirected with a fast Meta refresh command to another page. Other forms of redirection include use of JavaScript and server side redirection, from the server configuration file. Some doorway pages may be dynamic pages generated by scripting languages such as Perl and PHP.

== Identification ==
Doorway pages are often easy to identify in that they have been designed primarily for search engines, not for human beings. Sometimes a doorway page is copied from another high ranking page, but this is likely to cause the search engine to detect the page as a duplicate and exclude it from the search engine listings.

Because many search engines give a penalty for using the META refresh command, some doorway pages just trick the visitor into clicking on a link to get them to the desired destination page, or they use JavaScript for redirection.

More sophisticated doorway pages, called Content Rich Doorways, are designed to gain high placement in search results without using redirection. They incorporate at least a minimum amount of design and navigation similar to the rest of the site to provide a more human-friendly and natural appearance. Visitors are offered standard links as calls to action.

Landing pages are regularly misconstrued to equate to Doorway pages within the literature. The former are content rich pages to which traffic is directed within the context of pay-per-click campaigns and to maximize SEO campaigns.

Doorway pages are also typically used for sites that maintain a blacklist of URLs known to harbor spam, such as Facebook, Tumblr and DeviantArt.

== Cloaking ==
Doorway pages often also employ cloaking techniques for misdirection. Cloaked pages will show a version of that page to human visitor which is different from the one provided to crawlers—usually implemented via server-side scripts. The server can differentiate between bots, crawlers and human visitors based on various flags, including source IP address or user-agent. Cloaking will simultaneously trick search engines to rank sites higher for irrelevant keywords, while displaying monetizing any human traffic by showing visitors spammy, often irrelevant, content. The practice of cloaking is considered to be highly manipulative and condemned within the SEO industry and by search engines, and its use can result in significant penalty or the complete removal of sites from being indexed.

== Redirection ==
Webmasters that use doorway pages would generally prefer that users never actually see these pages and instead be delivered to a "real" page within their sites. To achieve this goal, redirection is sometimes used. This may be as simple as installing a meta refresh tag on the doorway pages. An advanced system might make use of cloaking. In either case, such redirection may make your doorway pages unacceptable to search engines.

== Construction ==
A content-rich doorway page must be constructed in a search-engine-friendly manner, or it may be construed as search engine spam, possibly resulting in the page being banned from the index for an undisclosed amount of time.

These types of doorways utilize (but are not limited to) the following:

- Title-attributed images for keyword support
- Title-attributed links for keyword support

== In culture ==
Doorway pages were examined as a cultural and political phenomenon along with spam poetry and flarf.

== See also ==
- Cloaking
- Pharming
- URL redirection
- Keyword stuffing
- Article Spinning
