= RankBrain =

Machine learning-based search engine algorithm

RankBrain is a machine learning-based search engine algorithm, the use of which was confirmed by Google on 26 October 2015. It helps Google to process search results and provide more relevant search results for users. In a 2015 interview, Google commented that RankBrain was the third most important factor in the ranking algorithm, after links and content, out of about 200 ranking factors whose exact functions are not fully disclosed. As of 2015, RankBrain is "involved in every query," and affects the actual rankings "probably not in every query but in a lot of queries". The results show that RankBrain guesses what the other parts of the Google search algorithm will pick as the top result 80% of the time, compared to 70% for human search engineers.

If RankBrain sees a word or phrase it is not familiar with, the program can make a guess as to what words or phrases might have a similar meaning and filter the result accordingly, making it more effective at handling never-before-seen search queries or keywords. Search queries are sorted into word vectors, also known as “distributed representations”, which are close to each other in terms of linguistic similarity. RankBrain attempts to map this query into words (entities) or clusters of words that have the best chance of matching it. Therefore, RankBrain attempts to guess what people mean and records the results, which adapts the results to provide better user satisfaction.

RankBrain is trained offline with batches of past searches. Studies showed how RankBrain better interpreted the relationships between words. This can include the use of stop words in a search query ("the", "and", "without", etc.) – words that were historically ignored previously by Google, but are sometimes of a major importance to fully understanding the meaning or intent behind a person’s search query. It is also able to parse patterns between searches that are seemingly unconnected, to understand how those searches are similar to each other. Once RankBrain's results are verified by Google's team, the system is updated and goes live again.

Google has stated that it uses tensor processing unit (TPU) ASICs for processing RankBrain requests.

== Impact on digital marketing ==
RankBrain has allowed Google to speed up the algorithmic testing it does for keyword categories to attempt to choose the best content for any particular keyword search. This means that old methods of gaming the rankings with false signals are becoming less and less effective, and the highest quality content from a human perspective is being ranked higher in Google.

RankBrain has helped Google Hummingbird (the 2013 version of the ranking algorithm) provide more accurate results because it can learn words and phrases it may not know. It also learns them specifically for the country, as well as language, in which a query is made. So, if one looks up a query with the word boot in it within the United States, one will get information on footwear. However, if the query comes through the UK, then the information could also be in regard to storage spaces in cars.
