= Nofollow =

Attribute on a link for search engines

Nofollow is a setting on a web page hyperlink that directs search engines not to use the link for page ranking calculations. It is specified in the page as a type of link relation; that is: <a rel="nofollow" ...>. Because search engines often calculate a site's importance according to the number of hyperlinks from other sites, the nofollow setting allows website authors to indicate that the presence of a link is not an endorsement of the target site's importance.

== Concept and specification ==
The nofollow value was originally suggested to stop comment spam in blogs. Believing that comment spam affected the entire blogging community, in early 2005 Google's Matt Cutts and Blogger's Jason Shellen proposed the value to address the problem.

The specification for nofollow is copyrighted 2005–07 by the authors and subject to a royalty-free patent policy, e.g. per the W3C Patent Policy 20040205, and IETF RFC 3667 and 3668.

=== Example ===
HTML:

<a href="http://www.example.com/" rel="nofollow">Link content</a>

== Introduction and support ==
Google announced in early 2005 that hyperlinks with rel="nofollow" would not influence the link target's PageRank. In addition, the Yahoo and Bing search engines also respect this attribute value.

On June 15, 2009, Google software engineer Matt Cutts announced on his blog that GoogleBot changed the way it treats nofollowed links, in order to prevent webmasters from using nofollow for PageRank sculpting. Prior to this, webmasters would place nofollow tags on some of their links in order to maximize the PageRank of the other pages. As a result of this change, the usage of nofollow leads to the evaporation of the pagerank of outgoing normal links as they started counting total links while calculating page rank. The new system divides page rank by the total number of outgoing links irrespective of nofollow or follow links, but passes the page rank only through follow or normal links. Cutts explained that if a page has 5 normal links and 5 nofollow outgoing links, the page rank will be divided by 10 links and one share is passed by 5 normal links. However, as of March 1 2020, Google is treating the nofollow link attribute as a hint, rather than a directive, for crawling and indexing purposes.

== Interpretation by the individual search engines ==
While all engines that use the nofollow value exclude links that use it from their ranking calculation, the details about the exact interpretation of it vary from search engine to search engine.

- Google states that their engine "in general" takes "nofollow" literally and does not "follow" the link.
- Yahoo! follows it, but excludes it from their ranking calculation.
- Bing may not follow it, but they exclude it from their ranking calculation.
- Ask.com also respects the attribute.

rel="nofollow" Action	Google	Yahoo!	Bing	Ask.com
Uses the link for ranking	No	No	No	—N/a
Follows the link	No	Yes	—N/a	No
Indexes the "linked to" page	No	Yes	No	No
Shows the existence of the link	Only for a previously indexed page	Yes	Yes	Yes
In results pages for anchor text	Only for a previously indexed page	Yes	Only for a previously indexed page	Yes

== Use by websites ==
Many weblog software packages mark reader-submitted links this way by default (often with no option to disable it, except for modification of the software's code).

More sophisticated server software could suppress the nofollow for links submitted by trusted users like those registered for a long time, on a whitelist, or with an acceptable karma level. Some server software adds rel="nofollow" to pages that have been recently edited but omits it from stable pages, under the theory that stable pages will have had offending links removed by human editors.

The widely used blogging platform WordPress versions 1.5 and above automatically assign the nofollow attribute to all user-submitted links (comment data, commenter URI, etc.). However, there are several free plugins available that automatically remove the nofollow attribute value.

Social bookmarking and photo sharing websites that use the rel="nofollow" tag for their outgoing links include YouTube and Digg.com (for most links); websites that don't use the rel="nofollow" tag include Yahoo! My Web 2.0, Technorati Favs, and Propeller.com (no longer an active website).

== Repurpose ==
=== Control internal PageRank flow ===
Search engine optimization professionals started using the nofollow attribute to control the flow of PageRank within a website, but Google has since corrected this error, and any link with a nofollow attribute decreases the PageRank that the page can pass on. This practice is known as "PageRank sculpting". This differs from the attribute's original intended purpose. nofollow was designed to control the flow of PageRank from one website to another. However, some search engine optimization practitioners have suggested that a nofollow used for an internal link should work just like nofollow used for external links.

Several SEOs have suggested that pages such as "About Us", "Terms of Service", "Contact Us", and "Privacy Policy" pages are not important enough to earn PageRank, and so should have nofollow on internal links pointing to them. Google employee Matt Cutts has provided indirect responses on the subject, but has never publicly endorsed this point of view.

The practice is controversial and has been challenged by some SEO professionals, including Shari Thurow and Adam Audette. Site search proponents have pointed out that visitors do search for these types of pages, so using nofollow on internal links pointing to them may make it difficult or impossible for visitors to find these pages in site searches powered by major search engines.

Although proponents of use of nofollow on internal links have cited an inappropriate attribution to Matt Cutts (see Matt's clarifying comment, rebutting the attributed statement) as support for using the technique, Cutts himself never actually endorsed the idea. Several Google employees (including Matt Cutts) have urged Webmasters not to focus on manipulating internal PageRank. Google employee Adam Lasnik has advised webmasters that there are better ways (e.g. click hierarchy) than nofollow to "sculpt a bit of PageRank", but that it is available and "we're not going to frown upon it".

YouTube, a Google company, uses nofollow on a number of internal "help" and "share" links.

== Qualified outbound links ==
On September 10, 2019, Google announced two additional ways for webmasters to qualify the relationship of outbound hyperlinks. The attribute rel="sponsored" may be used to denote links that are advertisements, sponsorships or other compensation agreements. The attribute rel="ugc", standing for "User-generated content", may be used to denote content such as user-contributed comments and forum posts. Additionally, the attributes may be combined, such as rel="ugc sponsored", denoting a link that was both user-generated and sponsored. In 2019, WordPress announced plans to convert all blog comments into rel="ugc".

These "hint" link attributes address some of the criticisms of nofollow by allowing webmasters to denote outbound links that lack "the weight of a first-party endorsement", but are not necessarily spam.

== See also ==
- Link building
- noindex
- PageRank
- Search engine optimization
- Spam in blogs about nofollow
- Web crawlers, also called Search engine spiders

=== Blocking and excluding content from search engines ===
- Robots exclusion standard (robots.txt)
- Robots meta tag
