= Matt Cutts =

American software engineer

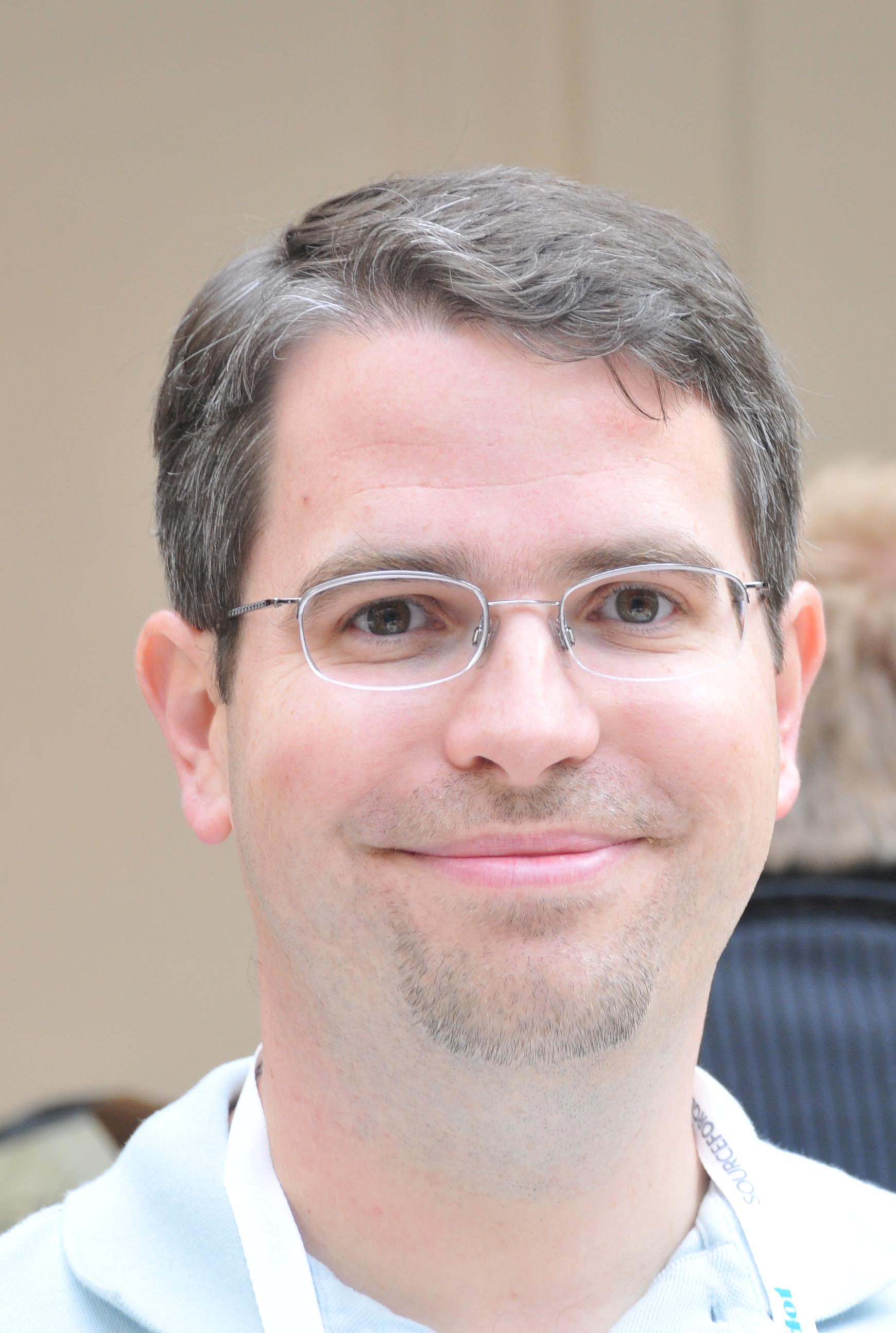
- Cutts in 2008
- Born: Matthew Cutts; 1972 or 1973 (age 53–54)
- Education: University of Kentucky (BS); University of North Carolina at Chapel Hill (MS)
- Occupation: Programmer
- Known for: SafeSearch, Google's family filter, Webspam Team
- Spouse: Cindy Cutts (m. 2000; died 2018)

Administrator of the United States Digital Service
- In office 2016 – April 2021
- President: Barack Obama; Donald Trump; Joe Biden
- Preceded by: Mikey Dickerson
- Succeeded by: Mina Hsiang

Matthew Cutts (born 1972 or 1973) is an American software engineer. Cutts is the former Administrator of the United States Digital Service. He was first appointed as acting administrator, to later be confirmed as full administrator in October 2018. Cutts previously worked with Google as part of the search quality team on search engine optimization issues. He is the former head of the web spam team at Google.

== Education ==
Cutts completed his high school career in Morehead, Kentucky at Rowan County Senior High School. He received a bachelor's degree in computer science and mathematics from the University of Kentucky in 1995. He went on to receive a Master of Science degree from the University of North Carolina at Chapel Hill in 1998.

== Career ==
Cutts started his career in search when working on his Ph.D. at the University of North Carolina at Chapel Hill. In January 2000, Cutts joined Google as a software engineer. At 2007 PubCon, Cutts stated that his field of study was computer science; he then moved into the field of information retrieval and search engines after taking two outside classes from the university's Information and Library Science department. Before working at the Search Quality group at Google, Cutts worked at the ads engineering group and SafeSearch, Google's family filter, which he designed. There, he earned the nickname "porn cookie guy" by giving his wife's homemade cookies to any Googler who provided an example of unwanted pornography in the search results.

Cutts is one of the co-inventors listed upon a Google patent related to search engines and web spam.

In 2006, The Wall Street Journal said "Cutts is to search results what Alan Greenspan was to interest rates".

In November 2010, Cutts started a contest challenging developers to make Microsoft Kinect more compatible with the Linux operating system. At the time, Microsoft had stated that the use of Kinect with devices other than the Xbox 360 was not supported by them.

Cutts has given advice and made statements on help related to the use of the Google search engine and related issues.

In January 2012, on the news that Google had violated its own quality guidelines, Cutts defended the downgraded PageRank of the Google Chrome homepage results, noting that it was not given special dispensation.

In July 2014, Cutts stated that he was going to take a few months of leave to spend more time with his family and try new things, including a half ironman race. Upon joining Google, Cutts agreed with his wife to work for four to five years and then spend a period of time together. Fifteen years later, Cutts made the decision to do so.

In May 2015, Google announced it had placed someone new in Cutts' position as the head of the web spam team, but this person would not be an official spokesperson for publisher and webmaster issues.

In January 2017, Cutts announced that he would be leaving Google to join the US Digital Service. Cutts noted that he handed in his notice to Google on December 31, 2016. Cutts was originally going to spend his leave at the USDS for three months; this then turned into six months.
