= Search engine optimization =

Practice and strategies of increasing online visibility

Search engine optimization (SEO) is the practice of improving the visibility and overall performance of websites and web pages in search engine results pages (SERPs). It focuses on increasing the quantity and quality of traffic from unpaid (organic) search results rather than paid advertising. SEO applies to multiple search formats, including web, image, video, news, academic, and vertical search engines, as well as AI-assisted search interfaces.

SEO is commonly used as part of a broader digital marketing strategy and involves optimizing technical infrastructure, content relevance, and authority signals to improve rankings for user queries. The objective of SEO is to attract users who are actively searching for information, products, or services, thereby improving brand visibility, user engagement, and conversions.

== History ==
Webmasters and content providers began optimizing websites for search engines in the mid-1990s as the first search engines were cataloging the early Web. Search engine users would query the URL of a page, and then receive information found on the page, if it existed in the search engine's index.

ALIWEB and the earliest versions of search engines required website developers to manually upload website index files in order to be searchable and widely did not utilize any form of ranking algorithm for user queries. The emergence of automated web crawlers would later be used to proactively discover and index websites. This led to website developers to optimize their website’s search signals, including the use of meta tags, to achieve greater visibility in search results.

According to a 2004 article by former industry analyst and current Google employee Danny Sullivan, the phrase "search engine optimization" came into use in 1997. Sullivan credits SEO practitioner Bruce Clay as one of the first people to popularize the term.

In some cases, early search algorithms weighted particular HTML attributes in ways that could be leveraged by web content providers to manipulate their search rankings. As early as 1997, search engine providers began adjusting their algorithms to prevent these actions. Eventually, search engines would incorporate more meaningful measures of page purpose, including the more recent development of semantic search.

Some search engines frequently sponsor SEO conferences, webchats, and seminars. Major search engines provide information and guidelines to help with website optimization. Google has a Sitemaps program to help webmasters learn if Google is having any problems indexing their website and also provides data on Google traffic to the website. Bing Webmaster Tools provides a way for webmasters to submit a sitemap and web feeds, allows users to determine the "crawl rate", and track the web pages index status.

In 2015, it was reported that Google was developing and promoting mobile search as a key feature within future products, resulting in brands and marketers shifting toward mobile-first experiences.

=== Relationship between SEO and large language models ===
In the 2020s in response to the AI boom, digital marketers developed new optimization approaches for LLM-based search, referred to as answer engine optimization (AEO) or generative engine optimization (GEO). These terms are often used interchangeably, and other related terms exist, such as AI engine optimization (AIEO).

Digital marketers optimizing for GEO tend to focus on content structure, authority signals, and structured data, with the goal of becoming a trusted, citable source in AI-generated responses.

However, Google states that its AI Overviews and AI Mode do not require additional technical optimization beyond the existing requirements for appearing in Google Search. Pages must be indexed and eligible to appear in Search, while established SEO practices such as allowing crawling, using internal links, providing accessible textual content, and maintaining useful, reliable, people-first content remain applicable to these AI features.

== Relationship between Google and SEO industry ==
In 1998, two graduate students at Stanford University, Larry Page and Sergey Brin, developed "Backrub", a search engine that relied on a mathematical algorithm to rate the prominence of web pages. The number calculated by the algorithm, PageRank, is a function of the quantity and strength of inbound links. PageRank estimates the likelihood that a given page will be reached by a web user who randomly surfs the web and follows links from one page to another. In effect, this means that some links are stronger than others, as a higher PageRank page is more likely to be reached by the random web surfer.

Page and Brin founded Google in 1998. Google attracted a loyal following among the growing number of Internet users, who liked its simple design. Off-page factors (such as PageRank and hyperlink analysis) were considered as well as on-page factors (such as keyword frequency, meta tags, headings, links and site structure) to enable Google to avoid the kind of manipulation seen in search engines that only considered on-page factors for their rankings. Although PageRank was more difficult to game, webmasters had already developed link-building tools and schemes to influence the Inktomi search engine, and these methods proved similarly applicable to gaming PageRank. Many sites focus on exchanging, buying, and selling links, often on a massive scale. Some of these schemes involved the creation of thousands of sites for the sole purpose of link spamming.

By 2004, search engines had incorporated a wide range of undisclosed factors in their ranking algorithms to reduce the impact of link manipulation. The leading search engines, Google, Bing, and Yahoo, do not disclose the algorithms they use to rank pages. Patents related to search engines can provide information to better understand search engines. In 2005, Google began personalizing search results for each user. Depending on their history of previous searches, Google crafted results for logged in users.

In 2007, Google announced a campaign against paid links that transfer PageRank. On June 15, 2009, Google disclosed that they had taken measures to mitigate the effects of PageRank sculpting by use of the nofollow attribute on links. Matt Cutts, a well-known software engineer at Google, announced that Google Bot would no longer treat any no follow links, in the same way, to prevent SEO service providers from using no follow for PageRank sculpting. As a result of this change, the usage of no follow led to evaporation of PageRank. In order to avoid the above, SEO engineers developed alternative techniques that replace no followed tags with obfuscated JavaScript and thus permit PageRank sculpting. Additionally, several solutions have been suggested that include the usage of iframes, Flash, and JavaScript. As a response, in 2019, Google would change its position and started using these tags as hints as a way to better understand how to appropriately analyze and use links within their systems".

In December 2009, Google announced it would be using the web search history of all its users in order to populate search results. On June 8, 2010 a new web indexing system called Google Caffeine was announced. Designed to allow users to find news results, forum posts, and other content much sooner after publishing than before, Google Caffeine was a change to the way Google updated its index in order to make things show up quicker on Google than before. According to Carrie Grimes, the software engineer who announced Caffeine for Google, "Caffeine provides 50 percent fresher results for web searches than our last index..." Google Instant, a real-time search feature, was introduced in late 2010 to deliver more timely and relevant results. Historically, site administrators often spent months or years optimizing websites to improve their search rankings. With the rise of social media platforms and blogs, major search engines adjusted their algorithms to enable fresh content to rank more quickly in search results.

Google has implemented numerous algorithm updates to improve search quality, including Panda (2011) for content quality, Penguin (2012) for link spam, Hummingbird (2013) for natural language processing, and BERT (2019) for query understanding. These updates reflect the ongoing evolution of search technology and Google's efforts to combat spam while improving user experience.

Legal disclosures during the United States v. Google antitrust trial, which began in 2020, as well as the 2024 Google Search documentation leak, revealed more details on how Google's SEO system operated, including the usage of click-based metrics and Chrome browser data, which Google had previously denied.

On May 20, 2025, Google announced that AI Mode would be released to all U.S. users. AI Mode uses what Google calls a "query fan-out technique" which breaks down the search query into multiple sub-topics which generates additional search queries for the user.

== Methods ==
=== Getting indexed ===
A simple illustration of the Pagerank algorithm. Percentage shows the perceived importance.

The leading search engines, such as Google, Bing and Yahoo!, use crawlers to find pages for their algorithmic search results. Pages that are linked from other search engine-indexed pages do not need to be submitted because they are found automatically. The Yahoo! Directory and DMOZ, two major directories which closed in 2014 and 2017 respectively, both required manual submission and human editorial review. Google offers Google Search Console, for which an XML Sitemap feed can be created and submitted for free to ensure that all pages are found, especially pages that are not discoverable by automatically following links in addition to their URL submission console. Yahoo! formerly operated a paid submission service that guaranteed to crawl for a cost per click; however, this practice was discontinued in 2009. Nevertheless, SEO tools such as Semrush enable analysis of both paid and organic traffic by providing insights into cost per click and keyword performance.

Search engine crawlers may look at a number of different factors when crawling a site. Not every page is indexed by search engines. The distance of pages from the root directory of a site may also be a factor in whether or not pages get crawled.

Mobile devices are used for the majority of Google searches. In November 2016, Google announced a major change to the way they are crawling websites and started to make their index mobile-first, which means the mobile version of a given website becomes the starting point for what Google includes in their index.

=== Preventing crawling ===
To avoid undesirable content in the search indexes, webmasters can instruct spiders not to crawl certain files or directories through the standard robots.txt file in the root directory of the domain. Additionally, a page can be explicitly excluded from a search engine's database by using a meta tag specific to robots (usually <meta name="robots" content="noindex"> ). When a search engine visits a site, the robots.txt located in the root directory is the first file crawled. The robots.txt file is then parsed and will instruct the robot as to which pages are not to be crawled. As a search engine crawler may keep a cached copy of this file, it may on occasion crawl pages a webmaster does not wish to crawl. Pages typically prevented from being crawled include login-specific pages such as shopping carts and user-specific content such as search results from internal searches. In March 2007, Google warned webmasters that they should prevent indexing of internal search results because those pages are considered search spam.

In 2020, Google sunsetted the standard (and open-sourced their code) and now treats it as a hint rather than a directive. To adequately ensure that pages are not indexed, a page-level robot's meta tag should be included.

=== Increasing prominence ===
A variety of methods can increase the prominence of a webpage within the search results. Cross linking between pages of the same website to provide more links to important pages may improve its visibility. Page design makes users trust a site and want to stay once they find it. When people bounce off a site, it counts against the site and affects its credibility.

Writing content that includes frequently searched keyword phrases so as to be relevant to a wide variety of search queries will tend to increase traffic. Updating content so as to keep search engines crawling back frequently can give additional weight to a site. Adding relevant keywords to a web page's metadata, including the title tag and meta description, will tend to improve the relevancy of a site's search listings, thus increasing traffic. URL canonicalization of web pages accessible via multiple URLs, using the canonical link element or via 301 redirects can help make sure links to different versions of the URL all count towards the page's link popularity score. These are known as incoming links, which point to the URL and can count towards the page link's popularity score, impacting the credibility of a website.

=== White hat versus black hat techniques ===
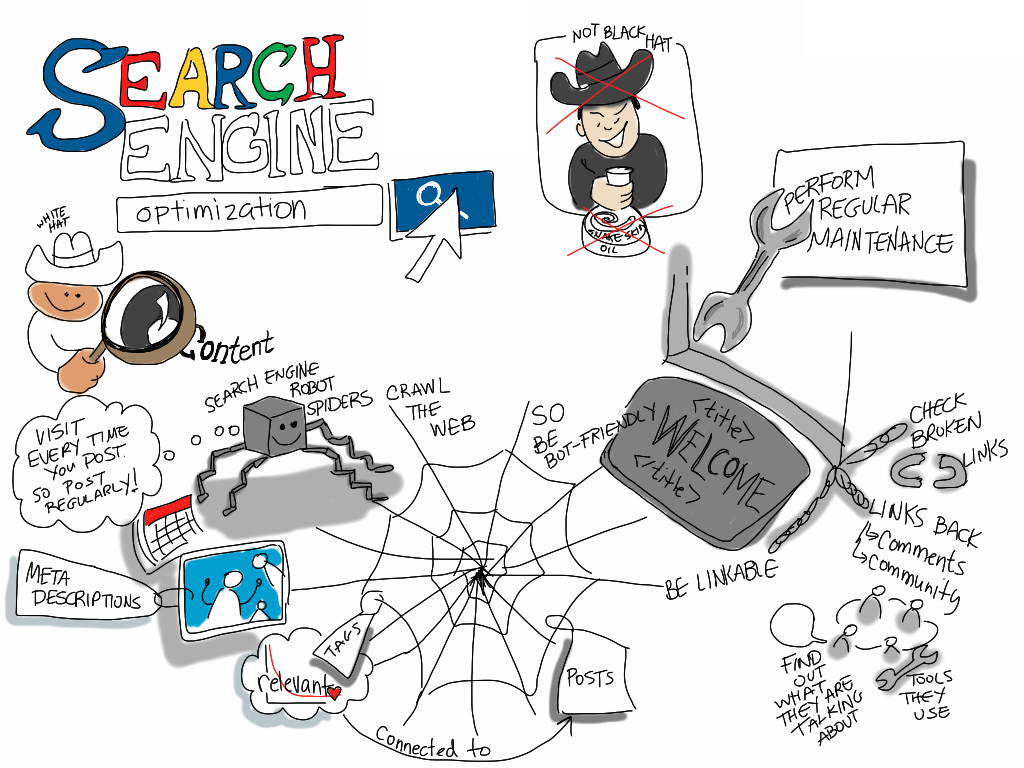
Common white-hat methods of search engine optimization

SEO techniques are often classified into two broad categories: techniques that search engine companies recommend ("white hat"), and those techniques of which search engines do not approve ("black hat").

Search engines attempt to minimize the effect of the latter, among them spamdexing. Industry commentators have classified these methods and the practitioners who employ them as either white hat SEO or black hat SEO.

A white hat SEO technique conforms to the search engines' guidelines. It's been compared to web development that promotes accessibility, although the two are not identical.

Black hat SEO attempts to improve rankings in ways that are disapproved of by the search engines or involve deception. A dated black hat technique involves using hidden text, either as text colored similar to the background, in an invisible div, or positioned off-screen. Search engines like Google have strong policies against many of these tactics.

White hat tactics tend to produce long-lasting results, whereas black hat tactics carry the risk that websites may eventually be penalized once search engines discover what they are doing.

Another category sometimes used is grey hat SEO. This is in between the black hat and white hat approaches, where the methods employed avoid the site being penalized but do not act in producing the best content for users.

Search engines may penalize sites they discover using black or grey hat methods, either by reducing their rankings or eliminating their listings from their databases altogether. Such penalties can be applied either automatically by the search engines' algorithms or by a manual site review. One example was the February 2006 Google removal of both BMW Germany and Ricoh Germany for the use of deceptive practices. Both companies subsequently apologized, fixed the offending pages, and were restored to Google's search engine results page.

Companies that employ black hat techniques or other spammy tactics can get their client websites banned from the search results. In 2005, the Wall Street Journal reported on a company, Traffic Power, which allegedly used high-risk techniques and failed to disclose those risks to its clients. Wired magazine reported that the same company sued blogger and SEO Aaron Wall for writing about the ban. Google's Matt Cutts later confirmed that Google had banned Traffic Power and some of its clients.

== As marketing strategy ==
SEO is one approach within digital marketing, alongside other strategies such as pay-per-click advertising and social media marketing. Search engine marketing (SEM) is the practice of designing, running, and optimizing search engine ad campaigns. Its difference from SEO is most simply depicted as the difference between paid and unpaid priority ranking in search results. SEM focuses on prominence more so than relevance; website developers should regard SEM with the utmost importance with consideration to visibility as most navigate to the primary listings of their search. A successful Internet marketing campaign may also depend upon building high-quality web pages to engage and persuade internet users, setting up analytics programs to enable site owners to measure results, and improving a site's conversion rate.

In November 2015, Google released a full 160-page version of its Search Quality Rating Guidelines to the public, which revealed a shift in their focus towards "usefulness" and mobile local search. In recent years the mobile market has exploded, overtaking the use of desktops, as shown in by StatCounter in October 2016, where they analyzed 2.5 million websites and found that 51.3% of the pages were loaded by a mobile device. Google has been one of the companies that are utilizing the popularity of mobile usage by encouraging websites to use their Google Search Console, the Mobile-Friendly Test, which allows companies to measure up their website to the search engine results and determine how user-friendly their websites are. The closer the keywords are together their ranking will improve based on key terms.

SEO may generate an adequate return on investment. However, search engines are not paid for organic search traffic, their algorithms change, and there are no guarantees of continued referrals. Due to this lack of guarantee and uncertainty, a business that relies heavily on search engine traffic can suffer major losses if the search engines stop sending visitors. Search engines can change their algorithms, impacting a website's search engine ranking, possibly resulting in a serious loss of traffic. According to Google's CEO, Eric Schmidt, in 2010, Google made over 500 algorithm changes – almost 1.5 per day. Industry analysts note that websites may face risks from algorithm changes that can significantly impact organic traffic. In addition to accessibility in terms of web crawlers (addressed above), user web accessibility has become increasingly important for SEO.

== International markets and SEO ==
Optimization techniques are highly tailored to the dominant search engines in the target market. Search engine market shares vary from one market to another, as does the level of competition. Google has maintained a dominant market share in most regions, although its share varies by market. In markets outside the United States, Google's share is often larger, and data showed Google was the dominant search engine worldwide as of 2007. As of 2006, Google had an 85–90% market share in Germany.

By the early 2000s, businesses began using SEO to target multilingual customers.

== Legal cases ==
On October 17, 2002, SearchKing filed suit in the United States District Court, Western District of Oklahoma, against the search engine Google. SearchKing's claim was that Google's tactics to prevent spamdexing constituted a tortious interference with contractual relations. On May 27, 2003, the court granted Google's motion to dismiss the complaint because SearchKing "failed to state a claim upon which relief may be granted."

In March 2006, KinderStart filed a lawsuit against Google over search engine rankings. KinderStart's website was removed from Google's index prior to the lawsuit, and the amount of traffic to the site dropped by 70%. On March 16, 2007, the United States District Court for the Northern District of California (San Jose Division) dismissed KinderStart's complaint without leave to amend and partially granted Google's motion for Rule 11 sanctions against KinderStart's attorney, requiring him to pay part of Google's legal expenses.

== See also ==
- Competitor backlinking
- Generative engine optimization
- List of search engines
- Search engine marketing
- Search neutrality, the opposite of search manipulation
- User intent
- Website promotion
- Search engine results page
- Search engine scraping
