= List of presidents of the Association for the Advancement of Artificial Intelligence =

The following is a list of all presidents of the Association for the Advancement of Artificial Intelligence from its founding in 1979. From 1985, presidents have served two-year terms.

No.	Image	Name	Term	Ref.
1		Allen Newell	1979–1980	
2		Edward Feigenbaum	1980–1981	
3		Marvin Minsky	1981–1982	
4		Nils John Nilsson	1982–1983	
5		John McCarthy	1983–1984	
6		Woody Bledsoe	1984–1985	
7		Patrick Winston	1985–1987	
8		Raj Reddy	1987–1989	
9		Daniel G. Bobrow	1989–1991	
10		Pat Hayes	1991–1993	
11		Barbara J. Grosz	1993–1995	
12		Randall Davis	1995–1997	
13		David Waltz	1997–1999	
14		Bruce Buchanan	1999–200	
15		Tom M. Mitchell	2001–2003	
16		Ronald J. Brachman	2003–2005	
17		Alan Mackworth	2005–2007	
18		Eric Horvitz	2007–2009	
19		Martha Pollack	2009–2010	
20		Henry Kautz	2010–2012	
21		Manuela M. Veloso	2012–2014	
22		Thomas G. Dietterich	2014–2016	
23		Subbarao Kambhampati	2016–2018	
24		Yolanda Gil	2018–2020	
25		Bart Selman	2020–2022	
26		Francesca Rossi	2022–2025	
27		Stephen Smith	2025–	
28		Michael Wooldridge	President-elect	
