= Moshe Tennenholtz =

Israeli computer scientist (born 1960)

- משה טננהולץ
- Born: 13 August 1960 (age 66); Haifa, Israel
- Education: Tel Aviv University; Weizmann Institute
- Awards: AAAI Fellow; ACM SIGART Autonomous Agents Research Award; ACM - AAAI Allen Newell Award IJCAI John McCarthy Award ACM Fellow
- Scientific career
- Fields: Computer science Game theory
- Workplaces: Stanford University; Technion; Microsoft Research

Moshe Tennenholtz (Hebrew: משה טננהולץ) is an Israeli computer scientist and professor with the faculty of Data and Decision Sciences at the Technion – Israel Institute of Technology, where he holds the Sondheimer Technion Academic Chair.

== Biography ==
Tennenholtz received his B.Sc. in mathematics from Tel Aviv University in 1986, and his M.Sc. and Ph.D. in 1987 and 1991 respectively from the Department of Applied Mathematics and Computer Science in the Weizmann Institute. From 1991 to 1993 he worked in the Robotics Laboratory at Stanford University, after which he joined the faculty at the Technion in Haifa. He returned to Stanford briefly as a visiting professor from 1999 to 2002 before returning to the Technion. In 2008 he started working at Microsoft Research and in 2011 he founded the basic research group at the Microsoft Israel R&D center. He has served as editor-in-chief of the Journal of Artificial Intelligence Research, associate editor of Games and Economic Behavior, the international journal of Autonomous Agents and Multi-Agent Systems, served on the editorial board of the Journal of Machine Learning Research, and served on the editorial board of AI Magazine. He served as program chair of the ACM Electronic Commerce conference and of the TARK conference.

== Recognition ==
He is an AAAI Fellow, an ACM fellow, and a fellow of the Society for the Advancement of Economic Theory. He is a winner of the Allen Newell award and of the John McCarthy award for pioneering contributions to the interplay between artificial intelligence and game theory. He also received the ACM SIGART Autonomous Agents Research Award for 2012. He was elected as an ACM Fellow in 2019 "for contributions to AI and algorithmic game theory".
