= Michael Luck =

Michael Luck may refer to:

- Michael Laucke (born 1947), Canadian classical and flamenco guitarist
- Michael Luck (computer scientist), British computer scientist
- Micheal Luck (born 1982), Australian professional rugby league player
