= Thomas G. Dietterich =

American computer scientist and academic

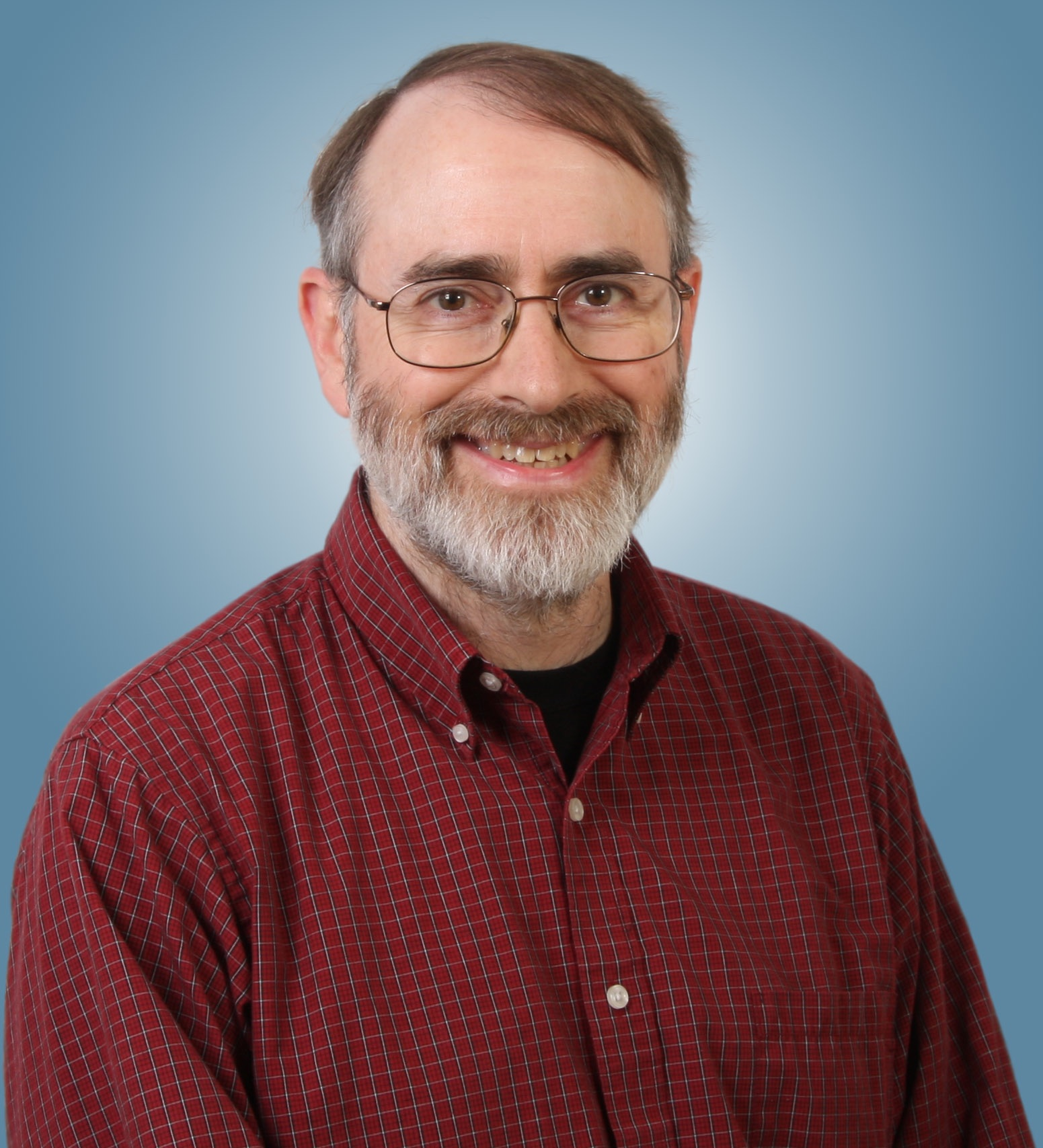
- Born: 1954 (age 71–72); South Weymouth, Massachusetts
- Known for: Executive Editor of Machine Learning (journal) (1992–98)

Academic background
- Education: Naperville Central High School; Oberlin College; University of Illinois, Urbana-Champaign; Stanford University
- Thesis: “Constraint-Propagation Techniques for Theory-Driven Data Interpretation” (1984)
- Doctoral advisor: Bruce G. Buchanan

Thomas G. Dietterich is emeritus professor of computer science at Oregon State University. He is one of the pioneers of the field of machine learning. He served as executive editor of Machine Learning (journal) (1992–98) and helped co-found the Journal of Machine Learning Research. In response to the media's attention on the dangers of artificial intelligence, Dietterich has been quoted for an academic perspective to a broad range of media outlets including National Public Radio, Business Insider, Microsoft Research, CNET, and The Wall Street Journal.

Among his research contributions were the invention of error-correcting output coding to multi-class classification, the formalization of the multiple-instance problem, the MAXQ framework for hierarchical reinforcement learning, and the development of methods for integrating non-parametric regression trees into probabilistic graphical models.

== Biography and education ==
Thomas Dietterich was born in South Weymouth, Massachusetts, in 1954. His family later moved to New Jersey and then again to Illinois, where Tom graduated from Naperville Central High School. Dietterich then entered Oberlin College and began his undergraduate studies. In 1977, Dietterich graduated from Oberlin with a degree in mathematics, focusing on probability and statistics.

Dietterich spent the following two years at the University of Illinois, Urbana-Champaign. After those two years, he began his doctoral studies in the Department of Computer Science at Stanford University. Dietterich received his Ph.D. in 1984 and moved to Corvallis, Oregon, where he was hired as an assistant professor in computer science. in 2013, he was named "Distinguished Professor". In 2016, Dietterich retired from his position at Oregon State University.

Throughout his career, Dietterich has worked to promote scientific publication and conference presentations. For many years, he was the editor of the MIT Press series on Adaptive Computation and Machine Learning. He also held the position of co-editor of the Morgan Claypool Synthesis Series on Artificial Intelligence and Machine Learning. He has organized several conferences and workshops including serving as Technical Program Co-Chair of the National Conference on Artificial Intelligence (AAAI-90), Technical Program Chair of the Neural Information Processing Systems (NIPS-2000) and General Chair of NIPS-2001. He served as founding President of the International Machine Learning Society and he has been a member of the IMLS Board since its founding. He is currently also a member of the Steering Committee of the Asian Conference on Machine Learning.

== Research interests ==
Professor Dietterich is interested in all aspects of machine learning. There are three major strands of his research. First, he is interested in the fundamental questions of artificial intelligence and how machine learning can provide the basis for building integrated intelligent systems. Second, he is interested in ways that people and computers can collaborate to solve challenging problems. And third, he is interested in applying machine learning to problems in the ecological sciences and ecosystem management as part of the emerging field of computational sustainability.

Over his career, he has worked on a wide variety of problems ranging from drug design to user interfaces to computer security. His current focus is on ways that computer science methods can help advance ecological science and improve our management of the Earth's ecosystems. This passion has led to several projects including research in wildfire management, invasive vegetation and understanding the distribution and migration of birds. For example, Dietterich's research is helping scientists at the Cornell Lab of Ornithology answer questions like: How do birds decide to migrate north? How do they know when to land and stopover for a few days? How do they choose where to make a nest? Tens of thousands of volunteer birdwatchers (citizen scientists) all over the world contribute data to the study by submitting their bird sightings to the eBird website. The amount of data is overwhelming – in March 2012 they had over 3.1 million bird observations. Machine learning can uncover patterns in data to model the migration of species. But there are many other applications for the same techniques which will allow organizations to better manage our forests, oceans, and endangered species, as well as improve traffic flow, water systems, the electrical power grid, and more.

I realized I wanted to have an impact on something that really mattered – and certainly the whole Earth's ecosystem, of which we are a part, is under threat in so many ways. And so if there's some way that I can use my technical skills to improve both the science base and the tools needed for policy and management decisions, then I would like to do that. I am passionate about that.

== Dangers of AI: an academic perspective ==
Dietterich has argued that the most realistic risks about the dangers of artificial intelligence are basic mistakes, breakdowns and cyberattacks, and the fact that it simply may not always work, rather than machines that become super powerful or destroy the human race. Dietterich considers machines becoming self-aware and trying to exterminate humans to be more science fiction than scientific fact. But to the extent that computer systems are given increasingly dangerous tasks, and asked to learn from and interpret their experiences, he said they may simply make mistakes. Instead, much of the work done in the AI safety community does indeed focus around accidents and design flaws.

== Positions held ==
- 2014–2016: President, Association for the Advancement of Artificial Intelligence (AAAI).
- 2013–present: Distinguished Professor of computer science, Oregon State University.
- 2011–present: Chief Scientist, BigML, Corvallis, OR.
- 2005–present: Director of Intelligent Systems Research, School of Electrical Engineering and Computer Science, Oregon State University.
- 2006–2008: Chief Scientist, Smart Desktop, Inc., Seattle, WA.
- 2004–2005: Chief Scientist, MyStrands, Inc., Corvallis, OR.
- 1995-2013: Professor of computer science, Oregon State University.
- 1998–1999: Visiting Senior Scientist, Institute for the Investigation of Artificial Intelligence, Barcelona, Spain. (Sabbatical leave position)
- 1988–1995: Associate Professor of computer science, Oregon State University.
- 1991–1993: Senior Scientist, Arris Pharmaceutical Corporation, S. San Francisco, CA.
- 1985–1988: Assistant Professor of computer science, Oregon State University.
- 1979–1984: Research Assistant, Heuristic Programming Project, Department of Computer Science, Stanford University.
- 1979 (Summer): Member of Technical Staff, Bell Telephone Laboratories, Naperville, Illinois. Computer-to-computer file transfer and micro-code distribution to remote switching systems.
- 1977 (Summer): Assistant to the Director of Planning and Research, Oberlin College, Oberlin, Ohio. Developed institutional planning database.

== Awards and honors ==
Thomas Dietterich was honored by Oregon State University in the spring of 2013 as a "Distinguished Professor" for his work as a pioneer in the field of machine learning and being one of the mostly highly cited scientists in his field. He has also earned exclusive "Fellow" status in the Association for the Advancement of Artificial Intelligence, the American Association for the Advancement of Science and the Association for Computing Machinery. Over his career, he obtained more than $30 million in research grants, helped build a world-class research group at Oregon State, and created three software companies. He also co-founded two of the field's leading journals and was elected first president of the International Machine Learning Society.

His other awards and honors include:

- ACM Distinguished Lecturer, 2012-2013
- Fellow, American Association for the Advancement of Science, 2007
- Oregon State University, College of Engineering Collaboration Award, 2004
- Winner, JAIR Award for Best Paper in Previous Five Years, 2003
- Fellow, Association for Computing Machinery, elected 2003
- Oregon State University, College of Engineering Research Award, 1998
- Fellow, Association for the Advancement of Artificial Intelligence, elected 1994
- NSF Presidential Young Investigator, 1987-92
- Nominated for Carter Award for Graduate Teaching, 1987, 1988
- IBM Graduate Fellow, 1982, 1983
- Upsilon Pi Epsilon, 1996
- Sigma Xi, 1979–present
- State Farm Companies Foundation Fellowship, 1978
- Member, Board of Trustees, Oberlin College, 1977-1980
- Graduation with Honors in Mathematics, Oberlin College, 1977
- Phi Beta Kappa, 1977
- National Merit Scholar, 1973

== Selected publications ==
- Liping Liu, Thomas G. Dietterich, Nan Li, Zhi-Hua Zhou (2016). Transductive Optimization of Top k Precision. International Joint Conference on Artificial Intelligence (IJCAI-2016). pp. 1781–1787. New York, NY
- Md. Amran Siddiqui, Alan Fern, Thomas G. Dietterich, Shubhomoy Das (2016). Finite Sample Complexity of Rare Pattern Anomaly Detection. Uncertainty in Artificial Intelligence (UAI-2016). New York, NY
- Alkaee-Taleghan, M., Hall, K., Crowley, M., Albers, H. J., Dietterich, T. G. (2015). PAC Optimal MDP Planning for Ecosystem Management. Journal of Machine Learning Research, 16, 3877-3903
- Thomas Dietterich, Eric Horvitz (2015). Viewpoint: Rise of Concerns about AI: Reflections and Directions. Communications of the ACM, 58(10) 38-40
- Dietterich, T. G. (2009). Machine Learning in Ecosystem Informatics and Sustainability. Abstract of Invited Talk. Proceedings of the 2009 International Joint Conference on Artificial Intelligence (IJCAI-2009). Pasadena, CA
- Dietterich, T. G., Bao, X., Keiser, V., Shen, J. (2010). Machine Learning Methods for High Level Cyber Situation Awareness. pp. 227–247 in Jajodia, S., Liu, P., Swarup, V., Wang, C. (Eds.) Cyber Situational Awareness, Springer.
- Dietterich, T. G., Domingos, P., Getoor, L., Muggleton, S. Tadepalli, P. (2008). Structured machine learning: the next ten years. Machine Learning. 73(1) 3-23. DOI: 10.1007/s10994-008-5079-1
- Dietterich, T. G., Bao, X. (2008). Integrating Multiple Learning Components Through Markov Logic. Twenty-Third Conference on Artificial Intelligence (AAAI-2008). 622-627
- Dietterich, T. G. (2007). Machine Learning in Ecosystem Informatics. Proceedings of the Tenth International Conference on Discovery Science. Lecture Notes in Artificial Intelligence Volume 4755, Springer, Berlin
- Dietterich, T. G. Learning and Reasoning. Technical report, School of Electrical Engineering and Computer Science, Oregon State University.
- Dietterich, T. G. (2003). Machine Learning. In Nature Encyclopedia of Cognitive Science, London: Macmillan, 2003.
- Dietterich, T. G. (2002). Machine Learning for Sequential Data: A Review. In T. Caelli (Ed.) Structural, Syntactic, and Statistical Pattern Recognition; Lecture Notes in Computer Science, Vol. 2396. (pp. 15–30). Springer-Verlag
- Dietterich, T. G. (2002). Ensemble Learning. In The Handbook of Brain Theory and Neural Networks, Second edition, (M.A. Arbib, Ed.), Cambridge, MA: The MIT Press, 2002. 405-408.
- Dietterich, T. G. (2000). The Divide-and-Conquer Manifesto In Algorithmic Learning Theory 11th International Conference (ALT 2000) (pp. 13–26). New York: Springer-Verlag.
- Dietterich, T. G. (2000). Hierarchical reinforcement learning with the MAXQ value function decomposition. Journal of Artificial Intelligence Research, 13, 227-303.
- Dietterich, T. G. (2000). Machine Learning. In David Hemmendinger, Anthony Ralston and Edwin Reilly (Eds.), The Encyclopedia of Computer Science, Fourth Edition, Thomson Computer Press. 1056-1059.
- Dietterich, T. G. (2000). An Overview of MAXQ Hierarchical Reinforcement Learning. In B. Y. Choueiry and T. Walsh (Eds.) Proceedings of the Symposium on Abstraction, Reformulation and Approximation SARA 2000, Lecture Notes in Artificial Intelligence (pp. 26–44), New York: Springer Verlag.
