= Michael Wooldridge (computer scientist) =

British computer scientist

Michael Wooldridge FRS
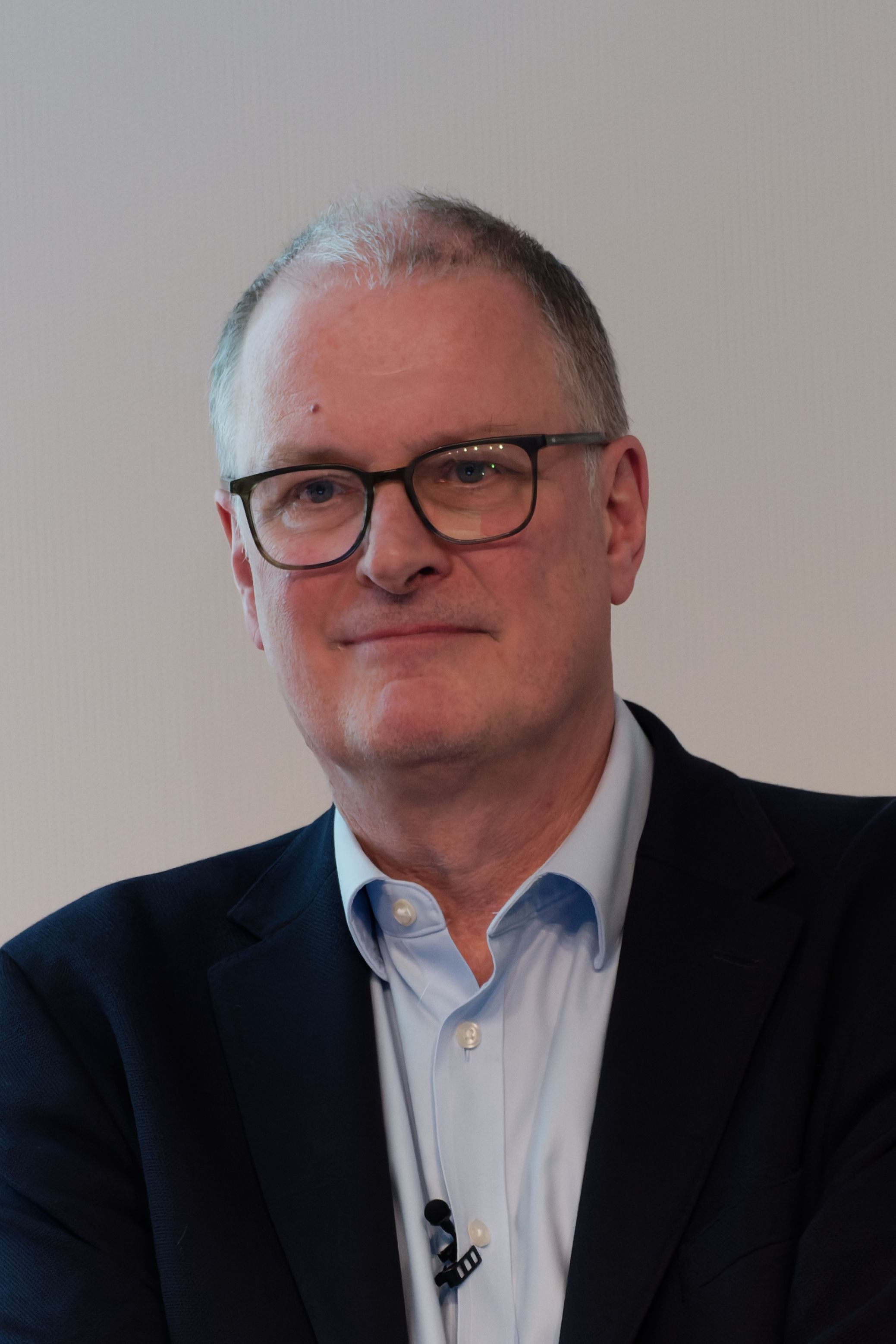
- Michael Wooldridge during his Prize Lecture at Royal Society in 2026
- Born: Michael John Wooldridge; 26 August 1966 (age 60); Wakefield, United Kingdom
- Education: Wolverhampton Polytechnic (BSc); University of Manchester Institute of Science and Technology (PhD)
- Known for: Multiagent systems
- Spouse: Janine Wooldridge
- Children: 2
- Awards: AAAI Fellow (2008); ACM Fellow (2015); BCS Lovelace Medal (2020); Royal Institution Christmas Lectures (2023); Fellow of the Royal Society (2026)
- Scientific career
- Fields: Artificial intelligence; Multi-agent systems; Computer Science; Intelligent agents; Knowledge representation
- Workplaces: University of Oxford; University of Liverpool; Manchester Metropolitan University
- Thesis: The Logical Modelling of Computational Multi-agent Systems (1992)
- Doctoral advisor: Gregory O'Hare
- Website: www.cs.ox.ac.uk/people/michael.wooldridge

Michael John Wooldridge FRS (born 26 August 1966) is a professor of computer science at the University of Oxford. His main research interests are in multi-agent systems, and in particular, in the computational theory aspects of rational action in systems composed of multiple self-interested agents. His work is characterised by the use of techniques from computational logic, game theory, and social choice theory.

== Education ==
Wooldridge was educated at Wolverhampton Polytechnic where he gained a BSc in 1989 and the University of Manchester Institute of Science and Technology (UMIST) where he was awarded a PhD in 1991 for research supervised by Gregory O'Hare.

== Career and research ==
Wooldridge was appointed a lecturer in Computer Science at the Manchester Metropolitan University in 1992. In 1996, he moved to London, where he became senior lecturer at Queen Mary and Westfield College in 1998. His appointment as full professor in the Department of Computer Science at the University of Liverpool followed in 1999. In Liverpool he served as head of department from 2001 to 2005 and as head of the School of Electrical Engineering, Electronics, and Computer Science from 2008 to 2011. In 2012 the European Research Council awarded him a five-year ERC Advanced Grant for the project Reasoning about Computational Economies (RACE). In the same year he left Liverpool to become professor of computer science at the University of Oxford, and served as head of the Department of Computer Science from 2014 - 2018. In Oxford he is a senior research fellow of Hertford College, Oxford.

Michael Wooldridge is author of more than 300 academic publications.

=== Editorial service ===
- 2003–2009 co-editor-in-chief of the journal Autonomous Agents and Multi-Agent Systems
- 2006–2009 associate editor of the Journal of Artificial Intelligence Research (JAIR)
- 2009–2012 associate editor of the Journal of Artificial Intelligence Research (JAIR)

Other editorships: Journal of Applied Logic, Journal of Logic and Computation, Journal of Applied Artificial Intelligence, and Computational Intelligence.

=== Awards and honours ===
He is a Fellow of the Association for the Advancement of Artificial Intelligence (AAAI), a European Coordinating Committee for Artificial Intelligence (ECCAI) Fellow, a Society for the Study of Artificial Intelligence and the Simulation of Behaviour (AISB) Fellow, and a British Computer Society (BCS) Fellow. In 2015, he was made Association for Computing Machinery (ACM) Fellow for his contributions to multi-agent systems and the formalisation of rational action in multi-agent environments. He was elected a Fellow of the Royal Society in 2026.

- 2025 Royal Society of London Michael Faraday Prize
- 2023 Royal Institution Christmas Lectures
- Wooldridge was the 300th guest on The Life Scientific interviewed by Jim Al-Khalili at the Royal Institution in London.
- 2021 Association for the Advancement of Artificial Intelligence AAAI/EAAI Outstanding Educator Award
- 2020 BCS Lovelace Medal
- 2015 Elected an Association for Computing Machinery (ACM) Fellow. For contributions to multi-agent systems and the formalisation of rational action in multi-agent environments.
- 2012–17 ERC Advanced Investigator Grant "Reasoning about Computational Economies (RACE)" (5-year €2m award)
- 2009 British Society for the Study of Artificial Intelligence and Simulation of Behaviour (SSAISB) Fellow
- 2008 American Association for Artificial Intelligence (AAAI) Fellow
- 2008 Influential Paper Award, Special Recognition from the International Foundation for Autonomous Agents and Multi-Agent Systems, for the paper Intelligent Agents: Theory and Practice
- 2007 European Association for Artificial Intelligence (ECCAI) Fellow
- 2006 ACM/SIGART Autonomous Agents Research Award. For significant and sustained contributions to the research on autonomous agents and multi agent systems. In particular, Dr. Wooldridge has made seminal contributions to the logical foundations of multi-agent systems, especially to formal theories of co-operation, teamwork and communication, computational complexity in multi-agent systems, and agent-oriented software engineering.

=== Publications ===
- Wooldridge, Michael (2000). Reasoning about Rational Agents. MIT Press. ISBN 978-0262515566.
- Wooldridge, Michael (2002). An Introduction to Multi-agent Systems (first ed.). John Wiley & Sons. ISBN 978-0471496915.
- Bussmann, Stefan; Jennings, Nicholas R.; Wooldridge, Michael (2004). Multiagent Systems for Manufacturing Control. Springer-Verlag. ISBN 978-3540209249.
- Bordini, Rafael H.; Hübner, Jomi Fred; Wooldridge, Michael (2007). Programming Multi-agent Systems in AgentSpeak Using Jason. Wiley-Blackwell. ISBN 978-0470029008.
- Wooldridge, Michael (2009). An Introduction to Multi-agent Systems (second ed.). John Wiley & Sons. ISBN 978-0470519462.
- Chalkiadakis, Georgios; Elkind, Edith; Wooldridge, Michael (2011). Computational Aspects of Cooperative Game Theory. Morgan & Claypool Publishers. ISBN 978-1608456529.
- Shaheen, Fatima; Kraus, Sarit; Wooldridge, Michael (2014). Principles of Automated Negotiation. Cambridge University Press. ISBN 978-1107002548.
- Wooldridge, Michael (22 March 2018). Artificial Intelligence. illus. Stephen Player. London: Ladybird Books. ISBN 978-0-7181-8875-7.
- Wooldridge, Michael (19 January 2020). A Brief History of Artificial Intelligence: What It Is, Where We Are, and Where We Are Going. New York: Flatiron Books. ISBN 9781250770745.
