= Zilberstein =

Zilberstein is a surname. Notable people with the surname include:

- Lilya Zilberstein (born 1965), Russian pianist
- Osher Zilberstein (fl. 1935–1973), European-born American rabbi
- Shlomo Zilberstein (born 1960), Israeli-American computer scientist
- Yitzchok Zilberstein (born 1934), Polish-born Haredi rabbi in Israel
