= Bessière =

Bessière is a French surname. Notable people with the surname include:

- Amiel-François Bessière (1869–1923), French bishop of Constantine-Hippone
- Christian Bessiere, French computer scientist
- Gérard Bessière (1928–2024), French diarist, poet, and priest
- Jean Bessière (born 1943), French professor of Comparative Literature
- Richard Bessière (1923–2011), French author

== See also ==
- Bessières
