= Bart Selman =

American computer scientist

- Education: Technical University of Delft; University of Toronto
- Awards: Sloan Research Fellowship (1999); Fellow, Association for the Advancement of Artificial Intelligence (2001); Fellow, American Association for the Advancement of Science (2003); Fellow, Association for Computing Machinery (2013)
- Scientific career
- Fields: Artificial intelligence
- Workplaces: AT&T Bell Laboratories; Cornell University
- Thesis: Tractable Default Reasoning (1991)
- Doctoral advisor: Hector Levesque

Bart Selman is a Dutch-American professor of computer science at Cornell University. He is also co-founder and principal investigator of the Center for Human-Compatible Artificial Intelligence (CHAI) at the University of California, Berkeley, led by Stuart J. Russell, and co-chair of the Computing Community Consortium's 20-year roadmap for AI research. In 2020-2022, he was the president of AAAI.

== Education ==
Selman attended the Technical University of Delft, from where he received a master's degree in physics, graduating in 1983. He received his master's and PhD in computer science from the University of Toronto in 1985 and 1991 respectively.

== Career ==
Selman has been working at AT&T Bell Laboratories before becoming professor of computer science at Cornell University.

His research areas include tractable inference, knowledge representation, stochastic search methods, theory approximation, knowledge compilation, planning, default reasoning, satisfiability solvers like WalkSAT, and connections between computer science and statistical physics, namely phase transition phenomena.

Selman co-founded in 2016 an AI alignment research organization named Center for Human-Compatible AI (CHAI), and became one of its principal investigators. His role in CHAI and some of his recent lectures notably focus on the safety and ethical aspects of advanced artificial intelligence.

== Honors and awards ==
Selman has received six Best Paper Awards for his work. He also received the Cornell Stephen Miles Excellence in Teaching Award, the Cornell Outstanding Educator Award, a National Science Foundation Career Award, and an Alfred P. Sloan Research Fellowship. He is a Fellow of the AAAI, the AAAS, and the ACM.

== Notable research papers ==
Selman is the author or co-author of more than 100 publications, including:

- Statistical regimes across constrainedness regions, Carla P. Gomes, Cesar Fernandez, Bart Selman, and Christian Bessiere. Proc. 10th Intl. Conf. on Principles and Practice of Constraint Programming (CP-04), Toronto, Ont., 2005. Distinguished Paper Award.
- Towards efficient sampling: Exploiting random walk strategies, Wei Wei, Jordan Erenrich, and Bart Selman. Proc. AAAI-04. San Jose, CA, 2004.
- Tracking evolving communities in large linked networks, John Hopcroft, Brian Kulis, Omar Khan, and Bart Selman. Proc. Natl. Acad. of Sci. (PNAS), Feb., 2004.
- Natural communities in large linked networks, John Hopcroft, Brian Kulis, Omar Khan, and Bart Selman. Proc. KDD, August 2003.
- Backdoors to typical case complexity, Ryan Williams, Carla Gomes, and Bart Selman. Proc. IJCAI-03 Acapulco, Mexico, 2003.
- Dynamic restart policies, Kautz, Henry, Horvitz, Eric, Ruan, Yongshao, Gomes, Carla, and Selman, Bart. Proceedings of the Eighteenth National Conference on Artificial Intelligence (AAAI-02) Edmonton, Alberta, Canada, 2002, 674–682.
- Generating hard satisfiability problems, Bart Selman, David G Mitchell, Hector J Levesque, Artificial intelligence, 1996
- Noise strategies for improving local search, Bart Selman, Henry A Kautz, Bram Cohen, AAAI, 1994
