= Ashok Goel =

Indian-American computer scientist

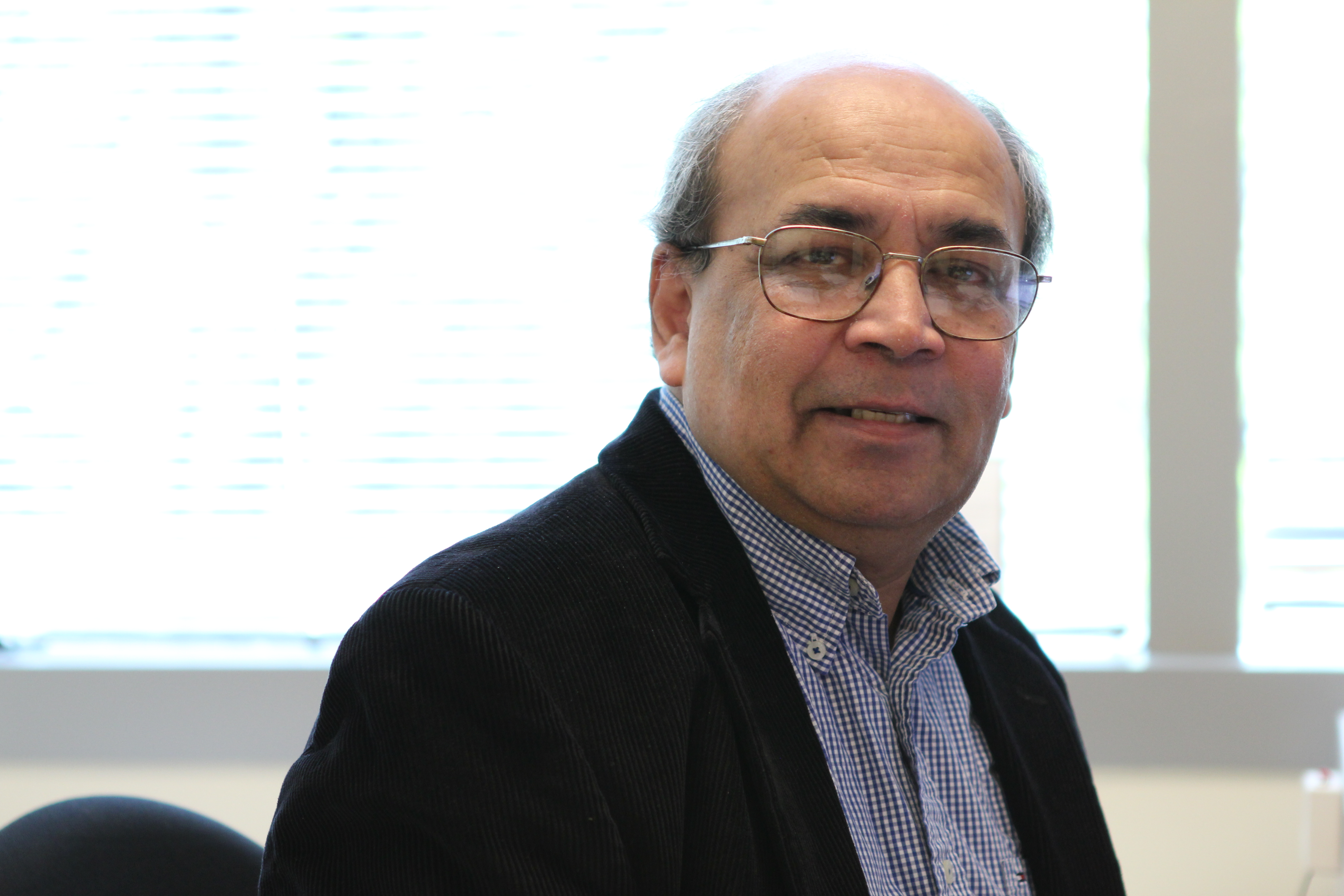
- Born: New Delhi, India
- Education: The Ohio State University
- Awards: AAAI Fellow, Fellow of Cognitive Science Society
- Scientific career
- Fields: Artificial Intelligence, Cognitive Science, Computer-Aided Design, Educational Technology
- Workplaces: Ohio State University, Georgia Institute of Technology
- Thesis: Integrating Case-Based Reasoning and Model-Based Reasoning for Adaptive Design Problem Solving (1989)
- Doctoral advisor: Balakrishnan Chandrasekaran, The Ohio State University
- Doctoral students: Jim Davies, Eleni Stroulia
- Website: http://dilab.gatech.edu/ashok-k-goel/

Ashok K. Goel is a professor of computer science and human-centered computing in the School of Interactive Computing at Georgia Institute of Technology, and the chief scientist with Georgia Tech's Center for 21st Century Universities. He conducts research into cognitive systems at the intersection of artificial intelligence and cognitive science with a focus on computational design and creativity. Goel is also the principal investigator and executive director of National Science Foundation's AI Institute for Adult Learning and Online Education and an editor emeritus of AAAI's AI Magazine.

== Research and scholarship ==
Conceptual design of technical systems, in particular biologically inspired engineering, provides one context for Goel's problem-driven research into cognitive systems. He has developed a theory of Structure-Behavior-Function models for understanding conceptual designs and a theory of model-based analogical reasoning for understanding the processes of biologically inspired design. In addition to information-processing theories of conceptual design, he has built computational tools (such as the Design by Analogy to Nature Engine) for supporting its practice. His 2012 TEDx talk Does Our Future Require Us To Go Back to Nature? summarizes this research. In 2014, he co-edited Biologically inspired design: Computational methods and tools published by Springer-Verlag. During 2008–18, Ashok was a co-director of Georgia Tech's Center of Biologically Inspired Design, and during 2012-17 he served on the board of directors of The Biomimicry Institute, including as the president of the board during 2015–17.

Learning about complex systems and systems thinking provides another context for Goel's use-inspired cognitive systems research. He has used Structure-Behavior-Function modeling to develop a series of interactive environments for supporting learning about complex systems resulting in the recent web-based virtual experimentation research assistant (VERA). Smithsonian Institution's Encyclopedia of Life's webportal provides direct access to VERA to support learning about ecological systems and the scientific way of systems thinking. Since 2015, Ashok has been a Faculty Fellow of the Brook Byers Institute for Sustainable Systems.

== Teaching and scholarship ==
During 2012–2019, Ashok was the Director of Georgia Tech's Ph.D. Program in Human-Centered Computing. Since 2019, he has been the Chief Scientist with the Georgia Tech's Center for 21st Century Universities, where he leads research on AI in education and education in AI. In 2014, Goel developed an online course on Knowledge-Based AI as part of Georgia Tech's Online Master of Science in Computer Science program. In 2016, the students in his lab developed Jill Watson, a virtual teaching assistant for automatically answering students’ questions in discussion forums of online classes based on the IBM Watson technology. His 2016 TEDx talk A Teaching Assistant named Jill Watson describes this experiment. In 2019, he co-edited Blended learning in practice: A guide for researchers and practitioners published by the MIT Press. He received AAAI's Outstanding AI Educator Award in 2019 and the University System of Georgia Regent's Award for Scholarship of Teaching and Learning in 2020. Since 2021, Ashok has been the Executive Director for NSF's National AI Institute for Adult Learning and Online Education (AI-ALOE). He was selected as an AAAI Fellow in 2021 and a Cognitive Science Society Fellow in 2022. Ashok was awarded the AAAI Distinguished Service Award in 2024.

Goel's teaching and research have been covered in The Wall Street Journal, The Washington Post, Wired, and EdTech among other media. A review article in a special issue of The Chronicle of Higher Education called virtual assistants exemplified by Jill Watson as one of the most transformative educational technologies in the digital era.
