= Manuela M. Veloso =

Portuguese-American computer scientist (born 1957)

Manuela Veloso
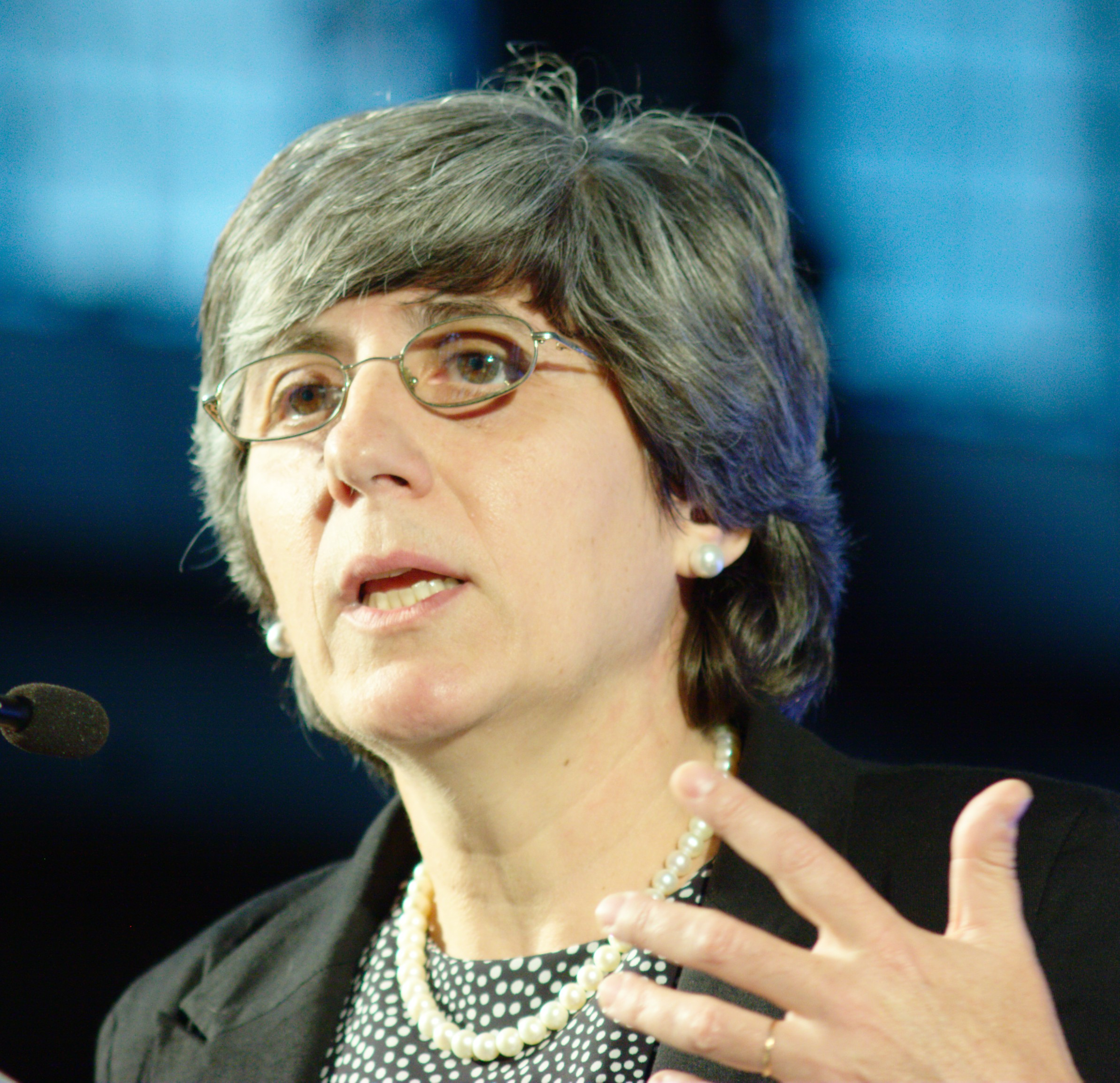
- Manuela Veloso at the Alan Turing Centenary Conference in Manchester in 2012
- Born: Manuela Maria Veloso; August 12, 1957 (age 69)
- Education: Instituto Superior Técnico - University of Lisbon (MSc); Boston University (MA); Carnegie Mellon University (PhD)
- Awards: National Science Foundation CAREER Award (1995); ACM Fellow (2016); AAAI Fellow (2003)
- Scientific career
- Fields: Artificial Intelligence; Robotics; Planning; Learning; Multi-agent systems
- Workplaces: JPMorgan Chase; Carnegie Mellon University
- Thesis: Learning by Analogical Reasoning in General Purpose Problem Solving (1992)
- Doctoral advisor: Jaime Carbonell
- Doctoral students: Astro Teller; Peter Stone
- Website: www.cs.cmu.edu/~mmv

Manuela Maria Veloso (born August 12, 1957) is the Head of J.P. Morgan AI Research & Herbert A. Simon University Professor Emeritus in the School of Computer Science at Carnegie Mellon University, where she was previously Head of the Machine Learning Department. She served as president of Association for the Advancement of Artificial Intelligence (AAAI) until 2014, and the co-founder and a Past President of the RoboCup Federation. She is a fellow of AAAI, Institute of Electrical and Electronics Engineers (IEEE), American Association for the Advancement of Science (AAAS), and Association for Computing Machinery (ACM). She is an international expert in artificial intelligence and robotics.

== Education ==
Manuela Veloso received her Licenciatura and Master of Science degree in electrical engineering from Lisbon's Instituto Superior Técnico in 1980 and 1984 respectively. She then attended Boston University, and received a Master of Arts in computer science in 1986. She moved to Carnegie Mellon University and received her Ph.D. in computer science there in 1992. Her thesis Learning by Analogical Reasoning in General Purpose Problem Solving was supervised by Jaime Carbonell.

== Career and research ==
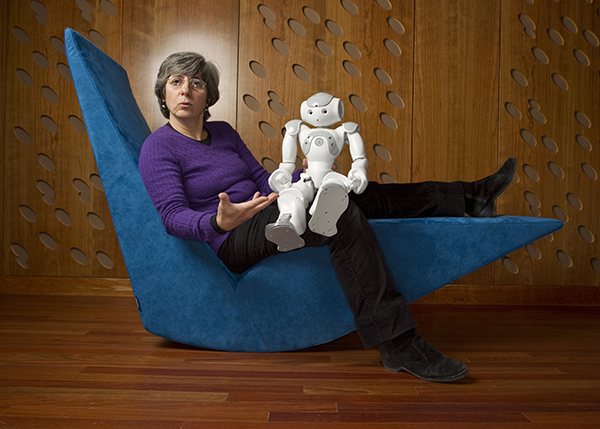
Manuela M. Veloso in 2011

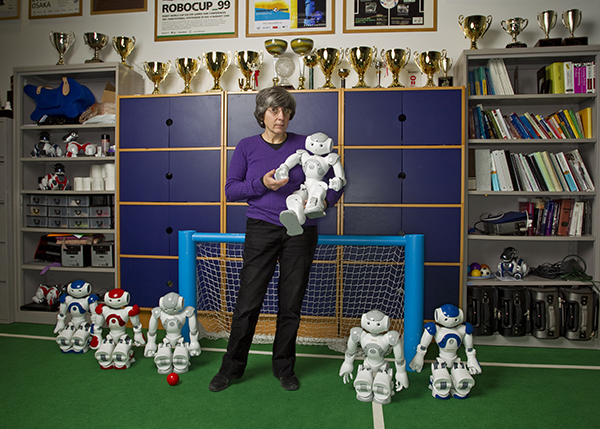
Manuela M. Veloso in 2011

Shortly after receiving her Ph.D., Manuela Veloso joined the faculty of the Carnegie Mellon School of Computer Science as an assistant professor. She was promoted to the rank of associate professor in 1997, and full professor in 2002. Veloso was a visiting professor at the Massachusetts Institute of Technology for the academic year 1999–2000, a Radcliffe Fellow of the Radcliffe Institute for Advanced Study, Harvard University for the academic year 2006–2007, and a visiting professor at Center for Urban Science and Progress (CUSP) at New York University (NYU) for the academic year 2013–2014. She is the winner of the 2009 ACM/SIGART Autonomous Agents Research Award. She was the Program Chair for IJCAI-07, held January 6–12, 2007, in Hyderabad, India and was program co-chair of AAAI-05, held July 9–13, 2005, in Pittsburgh. She was a member of the editorial board of CACM and the AAAI Magazine. She is the author of one book on Planning by Analogical Reasoning. As of 2015, Veloso has graduated 32 PhD students. She was appointed as the head of Carnegie Mellon's Machine Learning Department in 2016.

Veloso describes her research goals as the "effective construction of autonomous agents where cognition, perception, and action are combined to address planning, execution, and learning tasks". Veloso and her students have researched and developed a variety of autonomous robots, including teams of soccer robots, and mobile service robots. Her robot soccer teams have been RoboCup world champions several times, and the CoBot mobile robots have autonomously navigated for more than 1,000 km in university buildings. In a November 2016 interview, Veloso discussed the ethical responsibility inherent in developing autonomous systems, and expressed her optimism that the technology would be put to use for the good of humankind.

=== Honors and awards ===
- National Science Foundation CAREER Award in 1995.
- Allen Newell Medal for Excellence in Research in 1997.
- 2003 AAAI Fellow
- 2006/2007 Radcliffe Fellow at the Radcliffe Institute for Advanced Study, Harvard University
- 2010 Institute of Electrical and Electronics Engineers (IEEE) Fellow
- 2010 American Association for the Advancement of Science (AAAS) Fellow
- 2009 ACM/SIGART Autonomous Agents Research Award
- 2012 Einstein Chair Professor, Chinese Academy of Sciences
- 2016 ACM Fellow, for "contributions to the field of artificial intelligence, in particular in planning, learning, multi-agent systems, and robotics."

Veloso is featured in the Notable Women in Computing cards.
