= Bessières =

Bessières can refer to:

- Bessières, Haute-Garonne
- Jean-Baptiste Bessières, French marshal, duke of Istria (1768–1813)
- his younger brother, Bertrand Bessières (1773–1855)

== See also ==
- Bessière
