= Michael Wellman =

American computer scientist (born 1961)

Michael P. Wellman
- Born: Michael Paul Wellman; March 27, 1961 (age 65); Brooklyn, New York, US
- Education: MIT, Ph.D.
- Awards: Fellow of the Association for the Advancement of Artificial Intelligence and the Association for Computing Machinery
- Scientific career
- Fields: Computer Science
- Workplaces: University of Michigan

Michael Paul Wellman (born March 27, 1961) is an American computer scientist and Lynn A. Conway Collegiate Professor of Computer Science and Engineering at the University of Michigan, Ann Arbor. He formerly led his department as Richard H. Orenstein Division Chair of Computer Science and Engineering.

== Early life and education ==
He was born March 27, 1961. He received a PhD from the Massachusetts Institute of Technology in 1988 for his work in qualitative probabilistic reasoning and decision-theoretic planning.

== Career ==
In the areas of qualitative probabilistic reasoning and decision-theoretic planning, from 1988 to 1992, Wellman conducted research at the USAF's Wright Laboratory.

In 1992, he became a member of Computer Science and Engineering (CSE) division in the College of Engineering at the University of Michigan.

He served as director of the University of Michigan AI Laboratory from 2001 to 2005. In 2016, he became the college's associate dean for academic affairs. He was elected an Association for the Advancement of Artificial Intelligence Fellow in 2001 for his work in decision theory, qualitative probabilistic and utilitarian reasoning, planning, multiagent systems, computational economics, e-commerce, and his role as editor of the Journal of Artificial Intelligence Research.

He was also elected as a fellow of Association for Computing Machinery in 2005 for his work in market-based and decentralized computation.

As Chief Market Technologist for TradingDynamics, Inc. (now part of Ariba), he designed configurable auction technology for dynamic business-to-business commerce.

Wellman previously served as Chair of the ACM Special Interest Group on Electronic Commerce (SIGecom), and as Executive Editor of the Journal of Artificial Intelligence Research.

In 2014 Wellman won the ACM/SIGAI Autonomous Agents Research Award. In 2016, he was named the Lynn A. Conway Collegiate Professor of Computer Science and Engineering at the University of Michigan, Ann Arbor. In 2020, he was named division chair of CSE at University of Michigan. His term ended in June 2024.

== Research ==
His research has focused on computational market mechanisms and game-theoretic reasoning methods, with applications in electronic commerce, finance, and cyber-security.

His work has advanced the application of economic principles within AI, including mechanism design and market-based systems. Wellman’s research include computational game theory and electronic commerce, with a focus on developing market mechanisms for distributed decision-making.

He contributed to the development of the Trading Agent Competition (TAC).

Wellman has investigated the risks posed by autonomous trading agents, exploring vulnerabilities and potential instabilities in algorithmic trading. His recent work models how AI trading systems can impact financial stability, particularly examining manipulative behaviors like spoofing and the broader implications of AI in financial markets.

== See also ==
- Mechanism design
- Reinforcement Learning
- List of fellows of the Association for Computing Machinery
