= Peter Stone (professor) =

American professor (born 1971)

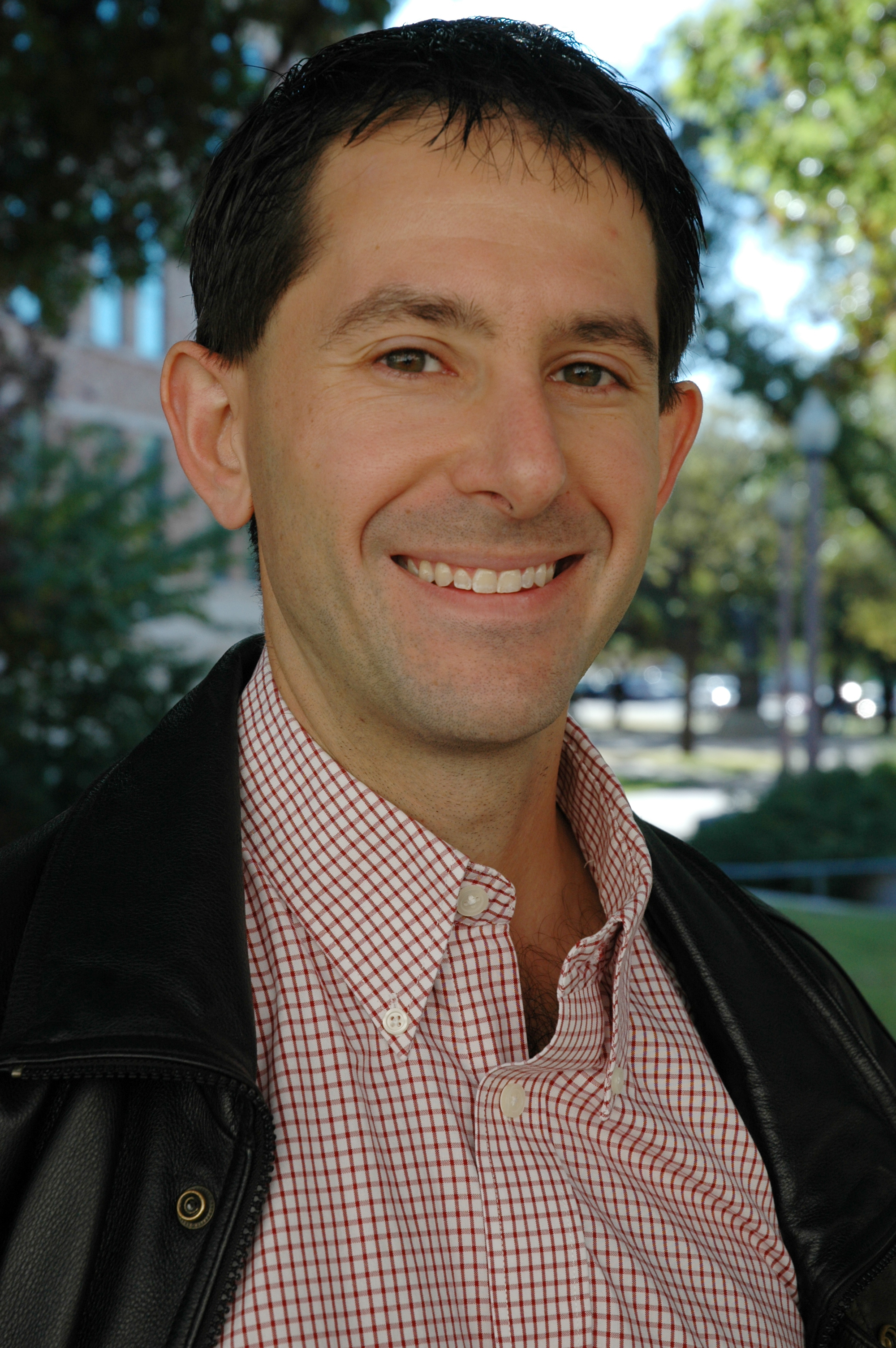
- Born: 13 July 1971 (age 55); Buffalo, New York, United States
- Education: Carnegie Mellon University, The University of Chicago
- Occupations: Computer Scientist, Professor
- Title: Truchard Foundation Chair and University Distinguished Teaching Professor
- Awards: IJCAI Computers and Thought Award
- Scientific career
- Fields: Computer Science, Robotics, Artificial Intelligence
- Workplaces: The University of Texas
- Thesis: Layered Learning in Multi-Agent Systems (1998)
- Doctoral advisor: Manuela Veloso
- Website: www.cs.utexas.edu/~pstone

Peter Stone is an American computer scientist who holds the Truchard Foundation Chair of Computer Science at The University of Texas at Austin. He is also Chief Scientist of Sony AI, an Alfred P. Sloan Research Fellow, Guggenheim Fellow, AAAI Fellow, IEEE Fellow, AAAS Fellow, ACM Fellow, and Fulbright Scholar.

== Educational background ==
He received his Ph.D. in 1998 and his M.S. in 1995 from Carnegie Mellon University, both in Computer Science. He received his B.S. in Mathematics from the University of Chicago in 1993.

== Career ==
Stone continued at Carnegie Mellon as a Postdoctoral Fellow for one year. From 1999 to 2002 he was a Senior Technical Staff Member in the Artificial Intelligence Principles Research Department at AT&T Labs – Research. He then joined the faculty of Computer Science Department at The University of Texas at Austin as an assistant professor. He was promoted to associate professor in 2007 and full professor in 2012. He was the founding director of Texas Robotics, and became Chair of the Computer Science Department in 2025. Stone was an adjunct professor at NYU in AY 2001-02, and a visiting professor at Hebrew University and Bar Ilan University in AY 2008-09.

Stone co-authored the papers that first proposed the robot soccer challenges around which Robocup was founded. He was President of the international RoboCup Federationfrom 2019 to 2022 and was a co-chair of RoboCup-2001 at IJCAI-2001. Since then, he served as a Program Co-Chair of AAMAS 2006, was General Co-Chair of AAMAS 2011, was a Program Co-Chair of AAAI-14, was the General Chair of RoboCup 2021, was Program Co-Chair of RLDM 2022, was Conference Chair of IJCAI 2023, and General Co-Chair of CoRL 2026. He has developed teams of robot soccer agents that have won RoboCup championships in the simulation (1998, 1999, 2003, 2005, 2011, 2012, 2014, 2015, 2016, 2017, 2018, 2019, 2020, 2021), in the standard platform (2012, 2024) and in the small-wheeled robot (1997, 1998) leagues. He has also developed agents that have won auction trading agents competitions (2000, 2001, 2003, 2005, 2006, 2008, 2009, 2010, 2011, 2013).

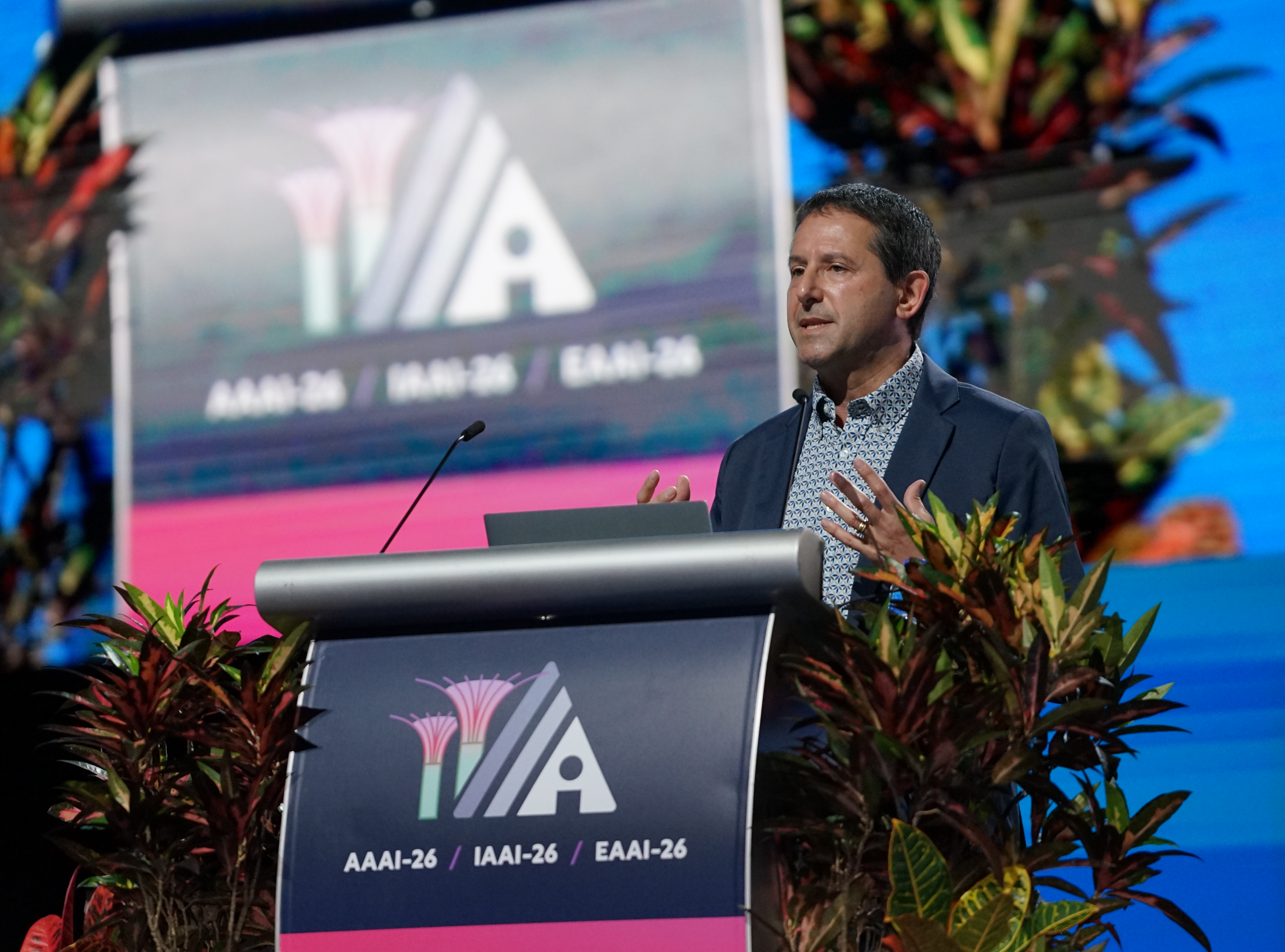
Stone speaking at AAAI 2026

Stone served as chair of the inaugural study panel of the One Hundred Year Study of Artificial Intelligence (AI100), which released a report in September 2016, titled "Artificial Intelligence and Life in 2030." The panel advocated for increased public and private spending on the industry, recommended increased AI expertise at all levels of government, and recommended against blanket government regulation. The report argued that AI won't automatically replace human workers, but rather, will supplement the workforce and create new jobs in tech maintenance. While mainly focusing on the next 15 years, the report touched on concerns and expectations that had risen in prominence over the last decade about the risks of superintelligent robots, stating "Unlike in the movies, there's no race of superhuman robots on the horizon or probably even possible. Stone stated that "it was a conscious decision not to give credence to this in the report."

Stone subsequently served as chair of the AI100 Standing Committee from 2018 to 2023, during which time the report of the second cycle of the AI100 study, chaired by Michael Littman, was published in 2021.

He served as the Founding Director of Texas Robotics and was a co-founder of The UT Austin Good Systems initiative on Ethical AI.

== Research ==
Stone describes his research interest as understanding how we can best create complete intelligent agents. His research focuses mainly on machine learning, multiagent systems, and robotics. Application domains have included robot soccer, autonomous bidding agents, autonomous vehicles, autonomic computing, and social agents.

In February of 2022, he co-authored a paper that appeared on the cover of Nature entitled Outracing champion Gran Turismo drivers with deep reinforcement learning, which reported on the creation of GT Sophy, a superhuman driving agent in Gran Turismo that was subsequently released into the video game.

In November 2025, Dr. Stone co-authored another paper that appeared on the cover of Nature, titled "Fair human-centric image dataset for ethical AI benchmarking." This research introduces the Fair Human-Centric Image Benchmark (FHIBE), a publicly available human image dataset implementing best practices for consent, privacy, compensation, safety, diversity, and utility. It can be used as a fairness evaluation dataset for many human-centric computer vision tasks, including pose estimation, person segmentation, face detection and verification, and visual question answering.

== Honors and awards ==
- 1997, Allen Newell Medal for Excellence in Research
- 2003, CAREER award from the National Science Foundation for his research on learning agents in dynamic, collaborative, and adversarial multiagent environments.
- 2004, named an ONR Young Investigator for his research on machine learning on physical robots.
- 2007, awarded the prestigious IJCAI Computers and Thought Award, given once every two years to the top AI researcher under the age of 35.
- 2008, Fulbright Award
- 2008, Guggenheim Fellow
- 2012, AAAI Fellow, Association for the Advancement of Artificial Intelligence.
- 2013, awarded The University of Texas System Regents' Outstanding Teaching Award.
- 2014, inducted into the UT Austin Academy of Distinguished Teachers
- 2016, ACM/SIGAI Autonomous Agents Research Award.
- 2018, IEEE Fellow, Institute of Electrical and Electronics Engineers.
- 2018, AAAS Fellow, American Association for the Advancement of Science.
- 2021, ACM Fellow, Association for Computing Machinery.
- 2022, ACM/SIGAI Industry Award for Excellence in Artificial Intelligence.
- 2025 ACM, AAAI Allen Newell Award
