= Saul Amarel =

American artificial intelligence pioneer (1928–2002)

Saul Amarel

Saul Amarel (February 16, 1928 – December 18, 2002) was a professor of computer science at Rutgers University, and best known for his pioneering work in artificial intelligence (AI). He also had a career as a scientist, engineer, and teacher. He was a contributor to advanced computing and AI methodologies, both applied to scientific inquiry as well as engineering practice.

== Biography ==
Amarel was born into a Thessaloniki, Greek Jewish family in 1928. He served in the Greek Resistance movement during World War II as the Germans invaded Greece. He was forced to flee with his family to Gaza, which was then in British Palestine.

Amarel graduated from Technion – Israel Institute of Technology in 1948 with a bachelor's degree in engineering and worked for the Israeli Ministry of Defense before heading to the United States. There he obtained his master's degree in 1953 and then a doctorate in Electrical Engineering in 1955 from Columbia University in New York.

From 1958 to 1969, Amarel led the Computer Theory Research Group at RCA Sarnoff Labs.

In 1969, Amarel founded the Department of Computer Science at Livingston College of Rutgers University, in New Brunswick, New Jersey.

From 1985 to 1988, Amarel served as Director of the Information Sciences and Technology Office for the Defense Advanced Research Projects Agency (DARPA).

In 1988, Amarel returned to Rutgers and was appointed the Alan M. Turing Professor of Computer Science, pioneering research in the field of AI.

Amarel received the Allen Newell Award from the Association for Computing Machinery (ACM) for his wide-ranging contributions to Artificial Intelligence, especially in advancing our understanding of the role of representation in problem solving, and of the theory and practice of computational planning. He was elected a Fellow of the Association for the Advancement of Artificial Intelligence in 1990 and of the Institute of Electrical and Electronics Engineers (IEEE) in 1994.

Amarel lived in Princeton, New Jersey, where he died in 2002 from a heart attack following a six-year battle with cancer. This occurred just as the celebration of his retirement from Rutgers University, after more than 40 years of leadership in computer science nationally and internationally, was under preparation for December 20, 2002.

Rutgers' high-performance computing cluster is named in his honor
