= Stuart J. Russell =

British computer scientist and author (born 1962)

Stuart Russell OBE FRS
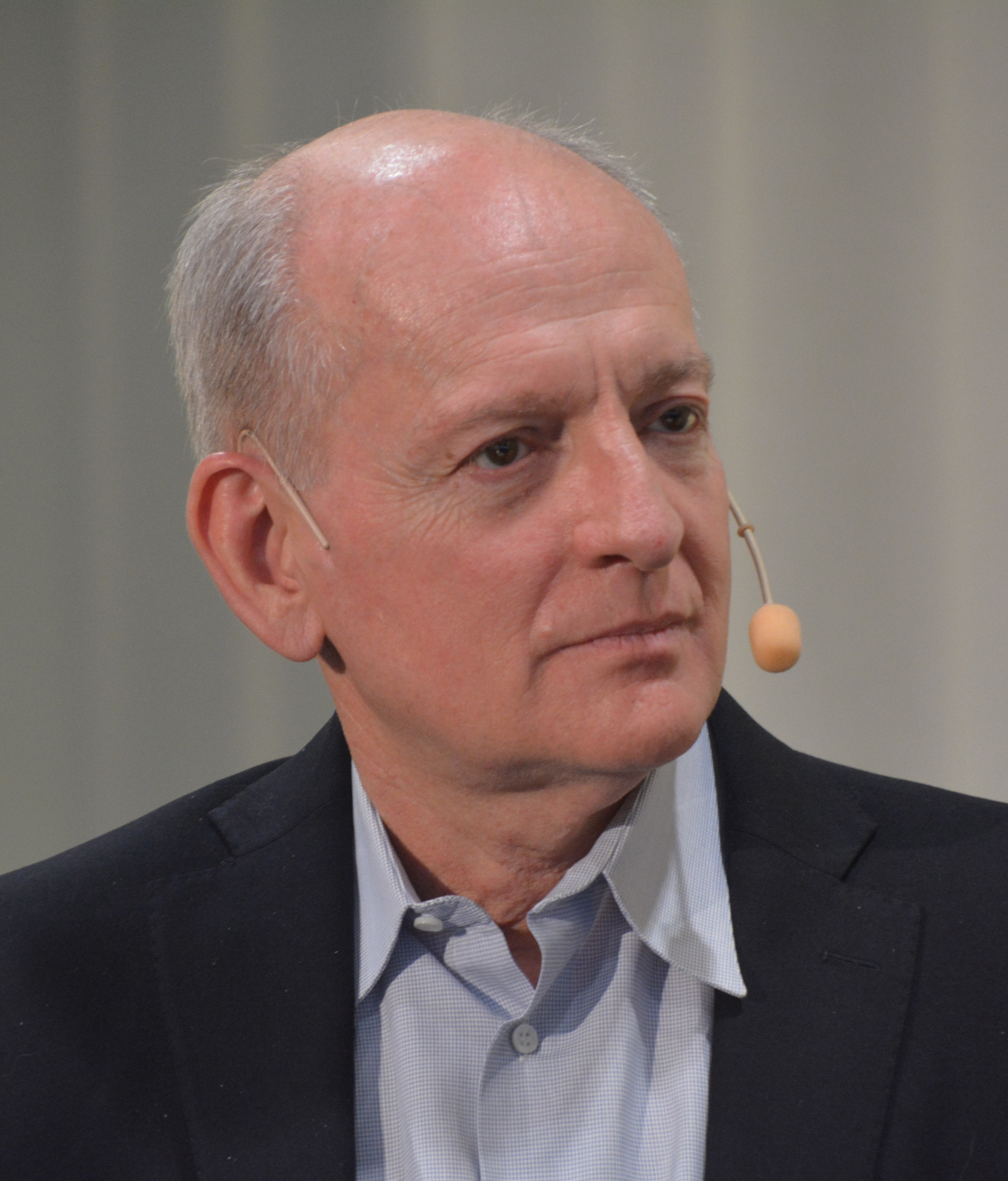
- Russell in 2019
- Born: Stuart Jonathan Russell; 1962 (age 63–64); Portsmouth, England
- Citizenship: British; American
- Education: University of Oxford (BA); Stanford University (PhD)
- Known for: Artificial Intelligence: A Modern Approach
- Awards: IJCAI Computers and Thought Award (1995); IJCAI Award for Research Excellence (2022); AAAI Fellow (1997); ACM Fellow (2003); AAAS Fellow (2011); Blaise Pascal Chair (2012); Reith Lectures (2021)
- Scientific career
- Fields: Artificial intelligence
- Workplaces: University of California, Berkeley; University of California, San Francisco
- Thesis: Analogical and Inductive Reasoning (1987)
- Doctoral advisor: Michael Genesereth
- Doctoral students: Marie desJardins; Eric Xing; Shlomo Zilberstein
- Other notable students: Nando de Freitas (postdoctoral researcher); Nir Friedman (postdoctoral researcher); Lise Getoor (master's student); Daphne Koller (postdoctoral researcher)
- Website: people.eecs.berkeley.edu/~russell/

Stuart Jonathan Russell OBE FRS (born 1962) is a British computer scientist known for his contributions to artificial intelligence (AI). He is a professor of computer science at the University of California, Berkeley and was from 2008 to 2011 an adjunct professor of neurological surgery at the University of California, San Francisco. Russell is the co-author with Peter Norvig of the authoritative textbook of the field of AI: Artificial Intelligence: A Modern Approach used in more than 1,500 universities in 135 countries.

== Education and early life ==
Russell was born in Portsmouth, England, and attended St Paul's School, London. He studied physics at Wadham College, Oxford, and was awarded a Bachelor of Arts degree with first-class honours in 1982. He moved to the United States to complete a PhD in computer science at Stanford University in 1986 for research on inductive reasoning and analogical reasoning supervised by Michael Genesereth. The PhD was supported by a NATO studentship from the UK Science and Engineering Research Council.

== Career and research ==
He then joined the faculty of the University of California, Berkeley as a professor of computer science. From 2008 to 2011 he also held an appointment as adjunct professor of Neurological Surgery at the University of California, San Francisco, where he pursued research in computational physiology and intensive-care unit monitoring. He is also an Honorary Fellow at Wadham College, Oxford. His research in the area of artificial intelligence includes contributions to machine learning, probabilistic reasoning, knowledge representation, planning, real-time decision making, multitarget tracking, computer vision, and inverse reinforcement learning. He has also been an active participant in the movement to ban the manufacture and use of autonomous weapons.

In 2016, he founded the Center for Human-Compatible Artificial Intelligence at UC Berkeley, with co-principal investigators Pieter Abbeel, Anca Dragan, Tom Griffiths, Bart Selman, Joseph Halpern, Michael Wellman and Satinder Singh Baveja. Russell has published several hundred conference and journal articles as well as several books, including The Use of Knowledge in Analogy and Induction and Do the Right Thing: Studies in Limited Rationality (with Eric Wefald). He and Peter Norvig were the authors of Artificial Intelligence: A Modern Approach, a textbook used by over 1,500 universities in 135 countries. He is on the Scientific Advisory Board for the Future of Life Institute and the advisory board of the Centre for the Study of Existential Risk.

In 2017 he collaborated with the Future of Life Institute to produce a video, Slaughterbots, about swarms of drones assassinating political opponents, and presented this to a United Nations meeting about the Convention on Certain Conventional Weapons.

In 2018 he contributed an interview to the documentary Do You Trust This Computer?.

His book, Human Compatible: Artificial Intelligence and the Problem of Control, was published by Viking on 8 October 2019. His work is aligned with Human-Centered Artificial Intelligence themes. His former doctoral students include Marie desJardins, Eric Xing and Shlomo Zilberstein.

Russell gave the 2021 Reith Lectures, broadcast on BBC Radio 4, on Living with Artificial Intelligence with lectures on "The Biggest Event in Human History", "AI in warfare", "AI in the economy" and "AI: A Future for Humans".

Along with other leading AI scientists including Geoffrey Hinton, Yoshua Bengio and Max Tegmark, Russell signed several open letters about the dangers of AI, including the open letter from the Future of Life Institute calling for "all AI labs to immediately pause for at least 6 months the training of AI systems more powerful than GPT-4", the Statement on Superintelligence, calling for "a prohibition on the development of superintelligence, not lifted before there is 1. broad scientific consensus that it will be done safely and controllably, and 2. strong public buy-in.", signed by over 130,000 individuals, and the Statement on AI Extinction Risk, stating that "Mitigating the risk of extinction from AI should be a global priority alongside other societal-scale risks such as pandemics and nuclear war.". In a January 2025 article in Newsweek, Russell wrote "In other words, the AGI race is a race towards the edge of a cliff."

== Awards and honors ==
Russell was co-winner, in 1995, of the IJCAI Computers and Thought Award at the International Joint Conferences on Artificial Intelligence, the premier international award in AI for researchers under 35. In 2022, he received the IJCAI Award for Research Excellence, only the second person (after Hector Levesque) to win both of IJCAI's main research awards. He is a fellow of the Association for the Advancement of Artificial Intelligence (AAAI), elected in 1997, the Association for Computing Machinery (ACM) (2003) and the American Association for the Advancement of Science (2011). In 2005, he was awarded the ACM Karl V. Karlstrom Outstanding Educator Award. In 2012, he was appointed to the Blaise Pascal Chair in Paris, awarded to "internationally acclaimed foreign scientists in all disciplines," as well as the senior Chaire d'excellence of France's Agence Nationale de la Recherche.

Russell served as vice chair of the World Economic Forum's Council on AI and Robotics and is currently a member of its Global AI Council. Other awards he has received include the National Science Foundation's Presidential Young Investigator Award, the World Technology Award, the Mitchell Prize, and the Association for the Advancement of Artificial Intelligence Outstanding Educator Award. He was appointed Officer of the Order of the British Empire (OBE) in the 2021 Birthday Honours for services to AI research.

In 2025 Russell was elected Fellow of the Royal Society. He was also elected to the National Academy of Engineering in 2025.

== Bibliography ==
- with Peter Norvig. Artificial Intelligence: A Modern Approach (4th ed.). Prentice Hall, 2020. ISBN 0-13-461099-7
- Human Compatible: Artificial Intelligence and the Problem of Control. Viking, 2019. ISBN 978-0-525-55861-3
