= Christian Bessiere =

French computer scientist

- Education: Ph.D. in computer science

Christian Bessiere is a French computer scientist. He is research director at Centre National de la Recherche Scientifique (CNRS, the French national institute for research). His lab is hosted by University of Montpellier, France. He is known for his work in artificial intelligence, especially in the area of constraint programming.

== Career ==
Bessiere received a Ph.D. in computer science in 1992.

In 2007, Bessiere was the program chair of the International Conference on Principles and Practice of Constraint Programming (CP). In 2012, he was the organizing committee chair of the European Conference on Artificial Intelligence (ECAI). In 2020, he was the program chair of the International Joint Conference on Artificial Intelligence (IJCAI). He has been associate editor of the Journal of Artificial Intelligence Research (JAIR) from 2008 to 2011, and associate editor of the Artificial Intelligence journal from 2011 to 2017. He has been a member of the advisory board of the Constraints journal since 2009.

In 2005, Bessiere was a founding member of the Association for Constraint Programming (ACP). He was a member of its executive committee until 2009, and its Treasurer until 2007. He was the president of the IJCAI board of trustees from 2021 to 2023. In 2024, he founded the Artificial Intelligence Scientific Organizations Coordinating Council (AISOCC) together with Eugene Freuder and Francesca Rossi.

In 2024, Bessiere was a member of the AAAI Presidential Panel on the Future of AI Research. In 2024, he gave a keynote speech at the UNESCO World Conference on Digital Education, in Shanghai. In 2025, he spoke at the Panel on 'Artificial Intelligence: Risks and Global Regulation' at the World Peace Forum, in Beijing.

== Honours and awards ==
In 2006, Bessiere has been elected a Fellow of the European Association for Artificial Intelligence (EurAI). In 2012, his paper Arc consistency and arc consistency again received an honourable mention at the 'AAAI Classic Paper Award'. In 2022, his paper An Optimal Coarse-grained Arc Consistency Algorithm received the 'AIJ Classic Paper Award' In 2026, Bessiere received the IJCAI Donald E. Walker Distinguished Service Award.
