= Michael Luck (computer scientist) =

British computer scientist

- Education: University College London (PhD)
- Scientific career
- Fields: Computer science, software engineering, software agents
- Workplaces: King's College London University of Southampton University of Warwick

Michael Luck is a computer scientist. He is Deputy Vice-Chancellor and Provost at the University of Sussex.

He was previously Professor of Computer Science based at the Department of Informatics, King's College London, in central London, England. He is also scientific advisor to Aerogility, an agent-based scheduling and forecasting software company with an aerospace focus.

His main research area is in intelligent agents and multi-agent systems.

== Education ==
Luck was educated at University College London where he was awarded a PhD in 1993.

== Career and research ==
From 1993 to 2000, Michael Luck was a lecturer based in the Department of Computer Science at the University of Warwick. From 2000 to 2006, Luck was a professor in the School of Electronics and Computer Science at the University of Southampton. While there, he led the AgentLink European Co-ordination Action for Agent-Based Computing. Luck moved to King's College London in 2007 and served as head of the Department of Informatics from 2011 to 2013. In 2013 he was appointed as Executive Dean of the Faculty of Natural and Mathematical Sciences, staying in that role until 2020. In that time he also led the UKRI Centre for Doctoral Training in Safe and Trusted Artificial Intelligence, serving as founding Director from 2019 until 2023. From 2021 to 2023, Luck served as founding Director of the King's Institute for Artificial Intelligence.

Luck's research addresses areas of AI, autonomous systems, intelligent agents and multiagent systems. He is the co-author of the books Understanding Agent Systems and Agent-Based Software Development.

=== Editorial service ===
- 2016–2022 co-editor-in-chief of the Journal of Autonomous Agents and Multi-Agent Systems

== Awards and honors ==
Luck is a Fellow of the European Association for Artificial Intelligence (EurAI), and a British Computer Society (BCS) fellow. In 2021, he was awarded fellow of King's College London.
