= Eric Horvitz =

American computer scientist, and Technical Fellow at Microsoft

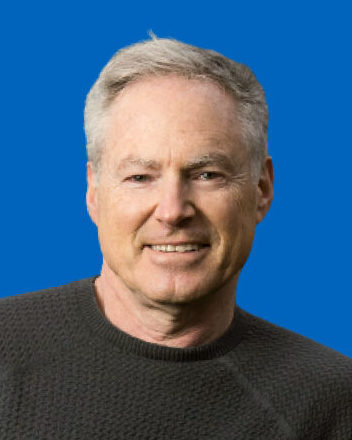
- Born: Eric Joel Horvitz
- Education: Ph.D and M.D. from Stanford University
- Occupation: Computer scientist
- Employer: Microsoft
- Title: Chief Scientific Officer

Eric Joel Horvitz (/ˈhɔːrvɪts/) is an American computer scientist, and Technical Fellow at Microsoft, where he serves as the company's first Chief Scientific Officer. He was previously the director of Microsoft Research Labs, including research centers in Redmond, WA, Cambridge, MA, New York, NY, Montreal, Canada, Cambridge, UK, and Bangalore, India.

Horvitz was elected a member of the National Academy of Engineering in 2013 for computational mechanisms for decision making under uncertainty and with bounded resources.

== Biography ==
Horvitz received his Ph.D and M.D. from Stanford University. His doctoral dissertation, Computation and Action Under Bounded Resources, and follow-on research introduced models of bounded rationality founded in probability and decision theory. He did his doctoral work under advisors Ronald A. Howard, George B. Dantzig, Edward H. Shortliffe, and Patrick Suppes.

He is currently the Chief Scientific Officer of Microsoft. He has been elected Fellow of the Association for the Advancement of Artificial Intelligence (AAAI), the National Academy of Engineering (NAE), the American Academy of Arts and Sciences, and of the American Association for the Advancement of Science (AAAS).

He was elected as an ACM Fellow in 2014 for "contributions to artificial intelligence, and human-computer interaction."

He was elected to the ACM CHI Academy in 2013 for “research at the intersection of human-computer interaction and artificial intelligence.”

He was elected to the American Philosophical Society in 2018.

In 2015, he was awarded the AAAI Feigenbaum Prize, a biennial award for sustained and high-impact contributions to the field of artificial intelligence through the development of computational models of perception, reflection and action, and their application in time-critical decision making, and intelligent information, traffic, and healthcare systems.

In 2015, he was also awarded the ACM - AAAI Allen Newell Award, for "contributions to artificial intelligence and human-computer interaction spanning the computing and decision sciences through developing principles and models of sensing, reflection, and rational action."

He has served on the President's Council of Advisors on Science and Technology (PCAST), the Scientific Advisory Committee of the Allen Institute for Artificial Intelligence (AI2), and the Computer Science and Telecommunications Board (CSTB) of the US National Academies.

He has served as president of the Association for the Advancement of AI (AAAI), on the NSF Computer & Information Science & Engineering (CISE) Advisory Board, on the council of the Computing Community Consortium (CCC), chair of the Section on Information, Computing, and Communications of the American Association for the Advancement of Science (AAAS), on the Board of Regents of the US National Library of Medicine (NLM), and a member of the National Security Commission on Artificial Intelligence (NSCAI) that was established in 2018 and issued its final report in March 2021.

== Work ==
Horvitz's research interests span theoretical and practical challenges with developing systems that perceive, learn, and reason. His contributions include advances in principles and applications of machine learning and inference, information retrieval, human-computer interaction, bioinformatics, and e-commerce.

Horvitz played a significant role in the use of probability and decision theory in artificial intelligence. His work raised the credibility of artificial intelligence in other areas of computer science and computer engineering, influencing fields ranging from human-computer interaction to operating systems. His research helped establish the link between artificial intelligence and decision science. As an example, he coined the concept of bounded optimality, a decision-theoretic approach to bounded rationality. The influences of bounded optimality extend beyond computer science into cognitive science and psychology.

He studied the use of probability and utility to guide automated reasoning for decision making. The methods include consideration of the solving of streams of problems in environments over time. In related work, he applied probability and machine learning to solve combinatorial problems and to guide theorem proving. He introduced the anytime algorithm paradigm in AI, where partial results, probabilities, or utilities of outcomes are refined with computation under different availabilities or costs of time, guided by the expected value of computation.

He has issued long-term challenge problems for AI—and has espoused a vision of open-world AI, where machine intelligences have the ability to understand and perform well in the larger world where they encounter situations they have not seen before.

He has explored synergies between human and machine intelligence. He introduced principles for using machine learning and decision theory to guide machine versus human initiative, methods that provide AI systems with understandings of when to transfer problem solving to humans, and the use of machine learning and planning techniques to identify and merge the complementary abilities of people and AI systems. In work on human-centered AI, he introduced measures and models of the expected value of displayed information to guide the display of information to human decision makers in time-critical settings and methods for making statistical AI inferences more understandable. He introduced models of human attention in computing systems, and studied the use of machine learning to infer the cost of interruptions to computer users. His use of machine learning to build models of human surprise was featured as a technology breakthrough by MIT Technology Review.

He investigated the use of AI methods to provide assistance to users including help with software and in the daily life.

He made contributions to multimodal interaction. In 2015, he received the ACM ICMI Sustained Accomplishment Award for contributions to multimodal interaction. His work on multimodal interaction includes studies of situated interaction, where systems consider physical details of open-world settings and can perform dialog with multiple people.

He co-authored probability-based methods to enhance privacy, including a model of altruistic sharing of data called community sensing and risk-sensitive approaches including stochastic privacy.

He is Microsoft's top inventor.

He led efforts in applying AI methods to computing systems, including machine learning for memory management in Windows, web prefetching, graphics rendering, and web crawling. He did early work on AI for debugging software.

Horvitz speaks on the topic of artificial intelligence, including on NPR and the Charlie Rose show. Online talks include both technical lectures and presentations for general audiences, for example with the TEDx talk Making Friends with Artificial Intelligence. His research has been featured in The New York Times and MIT Technology Review. He has testified before the US Senate on progress, opportunities, and challenges with AI.

== AI and society ==
Horvitz has addressed technical and societal challenges and opportunities with the fielding of AI technologies in the open world, including beneficial uses of AI, AI safety and robustness, and where AI systems and capabilities can have inadvertent effects, pose dangers, or be misused. He has also contributed to research on biosecurity risks associated with AI, including studies demonstrating that AI systems can generate novel variants of known toxins that may evade existing screening mechanisms. He has presented on caveats with applications of AI in military settings. He and Thomas G. Dietterich called for work on AI alignment, saying that AI systems "must reason about what people intend rather than carrying out commands literally."

He has called for action on potential risks to civil liberties posed by government uses of data in AI systems. He has also addressed AI policy and governance, including proposals to limit state-level regulation of AI in the US, emphasizing the importance of balancing innovation with accountability and public trust. He has further noted that ensuring the safety of AI systems may extend beyond the control of their developers as such systems are deployed more widely. He has suggested that limiting such regulatory efforts could reduce opportunities for governments to test and refine approaches to addressing societal risks associated with AI. He and privacy scholar Deirdre Mulligan stated that society must balance privacy concerns with benefits of data for social benefit.

He has presented on the risks of AI-enabled deepfakes and contributed to media provenance technologies that cryptographically certify the source and history of edits of digital content. Horvitz has also presented at Stanford regarding AI governance and human flourishing, where he highlighted challenges in maintaining trust in digital content, noting that technical verification methods may not fully address these concerns.

=== Asilomar AI study ===
Horvitz served as President of the AAAI from 2007–2009. As AAAI President, he called together and co-chaired the Asilomar AI study which culminated in a meeting of AI scientists at Asilomar in February 2009. The study considered the nature and timing of AI successes and reviewed concerns about directions with AI developments, including the potential loss of control over computer-based intelligences, and also efforts that could reduce concerns and enhance long-term societal outcomes. The study was the first meeting of AI scientists to address concerns about superintelligence and loss of control of AI and attracted interest by the public.

In coverage of the Asilomar study, he said that scientists must study and respond to notions of superintelligent machines and concerns about artificial intelligence systems escaping from human control. In a later NPR interview, he said that investments in scientific studies of superintelligences would be valuable to guide proactive efforts even if people believed that the probability of losing of control of AI was low because of the cost of such outcomes.

=== One Hundred Year Study on Artificial Intelligence ===
In 2014, Horvitz defined and funded with his wife the One Hundred Year Study of Artificial Intelligence (AI100) at Stanford University. In 2016, the AI Index was launched as a project of the One Hundred Year Study.

According to Horvitz, the AI100 gift, which may increase in the future, is sufficient to fund the study for a century. A Stanford press release stated that sets of committees over a century will "study and anticipate how the effects of artificial intelligence will ripple through every aspect of how people work, live and play." A framing memo for the study calls out 18 topics for consideration, including law, ethics, the economy, war, and crime. Topics include abuses of AI that could pose threats to democracy and freedom and addressing possibilities of superintelligences and loss of control of AI.

The One Hundred Year Study is overseen by a Standing Committee. The Standing Committee formulates questions and themes and organizes a Study Panel every five years. The Study Panel issues a report that assesses the status and rate of progress of AI technologies, challenges, and opportunities with regard to AI's influences on people and society.

The 2015 study panel of the One Hundred Year Study, chaired by Peter Stone, released a report in September 2016, titled "Artificial Intelligence and Life in 2030". The panel advocated for increased public and private spending on the industry, recommended increased AI expertise at all levels of government, and recommended against blanket government regulation. Panel chair Peter Stone argues that AI won't automatically replace human workers, but rather, will supplement the workforce and create new jobs in tech maintenance. While mainly focusing on the next 15 years, the report touched on concerns and expectations that had risen in prominence over the last decade about the risks of superintelligent robots, stating "Unlike in the movies, there's no race of superhuman robots on the horizon or probably even possible. Stone stated that "it was a conscious decision not to give credence to this in the report."

The report of the second cycle of the AI100 study, chaired by Michael Littman, was published in 2021.

=== Founding of Partnership on AI ===
He co-founded and has served as board chair of the Partnership on AI, a non-profit organization bringing together Apple, Amazon, Facebook, Google, DeepMind, IBM, and Microsoft with representatives from civil society, academia, and non-profit R&D. The organization's website points at initiatives, including studies of risk scores in criminal justice, facial recognition systems, AI and economy, AI safety, AI and media integrity, and documentation of AI systems.

=== Microsoft Aether Committee ===
He founded and chairs the Aether Committee at Microsoft, Microsoft's internal committee on the responsible development and fielding of AI technologies. He reported that the Aether Committee had made recommendations on and guided decisions that have influenced Microsoft's commercial AI efforts. In April 2020, Microsoft published content on principles, guidelines, and tools developed by the Aether Committee and its working groups, including teams focused on AI reliability and safety, bias and fairness, intelligibility and explanation, and human-AI collaboration.

== Publications ==
=== Books ===
- Horvitz, E. (December 1990), Computation and Action Under Bounded Resources (PDF) (Dissertation), Stanford, CA: Stanford University

=== Selected articles ===
- Horvitz, E. (2017-07-07), "AI, people, and society", Science, 357 (6346): 7, Bibcode:2017Sci...357....7H, doi:10.1126/science.aao2466, PMID 28684472
- Gershman, S.; Horvitz, E.; Tenenbaum, J. (2015-07-17), "Computational rationality: A converging paradigm for intelligence in brains, minds, and machines", Science, 349 (6245): 273–278, Bibcode:2015Sci...349..273G, doi:10.1126/science.aac6076, PMID 26185246, S2CID 14818619
- Kamar, E.; Hacker, S.; Horvitz, E. (June 2012), "Combining human and machine intelligence in large-scale crowdsourcing", Proceedings of the Third International Joint Conference on Autonomous Agents and Multiagent Systems - Volume 1 (PDF), vol. 1, Richland, SC: International Foundation for Autonomous Agents and Multiagent Systems, pp. 467–474, doi:10.65109/HMCS1623, ISBN 978-0-9817381-1-6
- Horvitz, E. (July 2008), "Artificial Intelligence in the Open World", Opening Session of the Annual Meeting, Association for the Advancement of Artificial Intelligence (Lecture), Chicago, IL
- Horvitz, E; Kadie, C; Paek, T; Hovel, D (March 2003), "Models of Attention in Computing and Communication: from Principles to Applications" (PDF), Communications of the ACM, vol. 46, no. 3, ACM, pp. 52–59, doi:10.1145/636772.636798, S2CID 2584780
- Horvitz, E. (February 2001), "Principles and Applications of Continual Computation" (PDF), Artificial Intelligence, 126 (1–2): 159–196, CiteSeerX 10.1.1.476.5653, doi:10.1016/S0004-3702(00)00082-5
- Horvitz, E (May 1999). "Principles of mixed-initiative user interfaces" (PDF). Proceedings of the SIGCHI conference on Human factors in computing systems the CHI is the limit - CHI '99. New York, NY: ACM. pp. 159–166. doi:10.1145/302979.303030. ISBN 0-201-48559-1. S2CID 8943607.
- Horvitz, E; Barry, M (August 1995), "Display of information for time-critical decision making" (PDF), UAI'95 Proceedings of the Eleventh conference on Uncertainty in artificial intelligence, San Francisco, CA: Morgan Kaufmann Publishers Inc, pp. 296–305, ISBN 1-55860-385-9
- D, Heckerman; Horvitz, E; Nathwani, Bharat (June 1992), "Toward Normative Expert Systems: Part I, the Pathfinder Project" (PDF), Methods of Information in Medicine, 31 (2): 90–105, doi:10.1055/s-0038-1634867, PMID 1635470, S2CID 14672300
- Henrion, M.; Breese, J.; Horvitz, E. (1991), "Decision analysis and expert systems", AI Magazine, 12 (4), Menlo Park, CA: American Association for Artificial Intelligence: 64–91, doi:10.1609/aimag.v12i4.919, S2CID 18217939
- Shwe, M.; Middleton, B.; Heckerman, D.; Hernion, M.; Horvitz, E.; Lehmann, H.; Cooper, G. (October 1991), "Probabilistic diagnosis using a reformulation of the INTERNIST-1/QMR knowledge base" (PDF), Methods of Information in Medicine, 30 (4): 241–255, doi:10.1055/s-0038-1634846, S2CID 2279911
- Horvitz, E.; Cooper, G.F.; Heckerman, D. (August 1989), "Reflection and action under scarce resources: Theoretical principles and empirical study" (PDF), IJCAI'89 Proceedings of the 11th International Joint Conference on Artificial Intelligence - Volume 2, San Francisco, CA: Morgan Kaufmann Publishers Inc.: 1121–1127
- Horvitz, E. (August 1988), "Reasoning under varying and uncertain resource constraints" (PDF), AAAI'88 Proceedings of the Seventh AAAI National Conference on Artificial Intelligence, AAAI Press: 111–116
- Horvitz, E.; Breese, J.; Henrion, M. (July 1988), "Decision theory in expert systems and artificial intelligence" (PDF), International Journal of Approximate Reasoning, 2 (3), New York, NY: Elsevier Science Inc.: 247–302, doi:10.1016/0888-613X(88)90120-X
- Horvitz, E. (July 1987), Reasoning about beliefs and actions under computational resource constraints (PDF), Arlington, VA: AUAI Press, pp. 429–447, arXiv:1304.2759, Bibcode:2013arXiv1304.2759H, ISBN 0-444-87417-8

=== Podcasts ===
- AI and Our Future With Machines with Dr. Eric Horvitz, Microsoft Research Podcast, 4 Dec 2017
- Potential and Pitfalls of AI with Dr. Eric Horvitz, Microsoft Research Podcast, 5 Mar 2020
