= Artificial Intelligence: A Modern Approach =

Book by Stuart J. Russell and Peter Norvig

- First edition (1995)
- Author: Stuart J. Russell and Peter Norvig
- Language: English
- Genre: Computer science
- Publisher: Prentice Hall
- Publication date: 2020 (4th Ed.)
- Media type: book
- Pages: 1136 (4th Ed.)
- ISBN: 0-13-461099-7
- OCLC: 359890490
- Dewey Decimal: 006.3 20
- LC Class: Q335 .R86 1995
- Website: aima.cs.berkeley.edu

Artificial Intelligence: A Modern Approach (AIMA) is a university textbook on artificial intelligence (AI), written by Stuart J. Russell and Peter Norvig. It was first published in 1995, and the fourth edition of the book was released on 28 April 2020.

AIMA has been called "the most popular artificial intelligence textbook in the world", and is considered the standard text in the field of AI. As of 2023, it was being used at over 1500 universities worldwide, and it has over 59,000 citations on Google Scholar.

AIMA is intended for an undergraduate audience but can also be used for graduate-level studies with the suggestion of adding some of the primary sources listed in the extensive bibliography.

== Content ==
AIMA gives detailed information about the working of algorithms in AI.

The book's chapters span from classical AI topics like searching algorithms and first-order logic, propositional logic and probabilistic reasoning to advanced topics such as multi-agent systems, constraint satisfaction problems, optimization problems, artificial neural networks, deep learning, reinforcement learning, and computer vision.

=== Code ===
The authors provide a GitHub repository with implementations of various exercises and algorithms from the book in different programming languages.

Programs in the book are presented in pseudo code with implementations in Java, Python, Lisp, JavaScript, and Scala available online.

== Editions ==
The first and last editions of AIMA were published in 1995 and 2020, respectively, with four editions published in total (1995, 2003, 2009, 2020).

The following is a list of the US print editions. For other editions, the publishing date and the colors of the cover can vary.

- 1st edition: published in 1995 with red cover
- 2nd edition: published in 2003 with green cover
- 3rd edition: published in 2009 with blue cover
- 4th edition: published in 2020 with purple cover

Various editions have been translated from the original English into several languages, including at least Chinese, French, German, Hungarian, Italian, Romanian, Russian, and Serbian.
