= Autonomous Agents and Multi-Agent Systems =

- Discipline: Multi-agent systems
- Language: English
- Edited by: Michael Luck and Kate Larson

Publication details
- History: 1998–present
- Publisher: Springer Science+Business Media
- Frequency: Bimonthly
- Impact factor: 1.431 (2020)

Standard abbreviations
- ISO 4: Auton. Agents Multi-Agent Syst.

Indexing
- CODEN: AAMSFJ
- ISSN: 1387-2532 (print); 1573-7454 (web)
- LCCN: 2004223417
- OCLC no.: 645283490

Links
- Journal homepage

Autonomous Agents and Multi-Agent Systems is a peer-reviewed scientific journal covering the study of autonomous agents and multi-agent systems.

It is published bimonthly by Springer Science+Business Media and is the official journal of the International Foundation for Autonomous Agents and Multiagent Systems. According to the Journal Citation Reports, the journal has a 2020 impact factor of 1.431.

Autonomous Agents and Multi-Agent Systems was established in spring 1998 under founding editor-in-chief Katia Sycara (Carnegie Mellon University). The current editors-in-chief are Michael Luck (King's College London) and Kate Larson (University of Waterloo).

== Abstracting and indexing ==
Autonomous Agents and Multi-Agent Systems is abstracted and indexed in Science Citation Index Expanded, Scopus, Inspec, EBSCO databases, Academic OneFile, ACM Computing Reviews, ACM Digital Library, Current Contents/Engineering, and EI-Compendex.
