= AAAI Fellow =

Award in artificial intelligence

- Awarded for: "Significant, sustained contributions to the field of artificial intelligence"
- Sponsored by: Association for the Advancement of Artificial Intelligence (AAAI)
- Date: Started in 1990
- Location: Palo Alto, California
- Country: United States
- Total no. of Fellows: 371
- Website: aaai.org/Awards/fellows-list.php

Fellowship of the Association for the Advancement of Artificial Intelligence (abbreviated as AAAI Fellow or FAAAI) is an award granted to individuals that the Association for the Advancement of Artificial Intelligence (AAAI), judged to have made "significant, sustained contributions — usually over at least a ten-year period — to the field of artificial intelligence" (AI). Only a small percentage of members are nominated Fellows of the AAAI.

== Nominations ==
Between 5 and 10 fellows are nominated annually (since 1990) by current AAAI members. At the time of their nomination fellows have typically contributed to the field of AI for a decade or more after receiving their PhD or are at an equivalent career stage.

A partial list of fellows including scientists and engineers such as John McCarthy, Marvin Minsky, Edward Feigenbaum, Judea Pearl, Geoffrey Hinton, Yoshua Bengio, Yann LeCun, and Stuart J. Russell can be found in the Category:Fellows of the Association for the Advancement of Artificial Intelligence. A comprehensive list of fellows nominated since 1990 can be found on the aaai.org website.

Some fellows use the post-nominal letters FAAAI.
