= Yoram =

Yoram (יֹרם or יורם) is a given name derived from Jehoram (יְהוֹרָם), meaning "Jehovah is exalted" in Biblical Hebrew, which was the name of several individuals in the Tanakh; the female version of this name is Athaliah. Notable people with the name include:

- Yoram Aridor (born 1933), former right-wing Israeli politician, Knesset member and minister
- Yoram Barzel (1931–2022), Israeli economist and a professor of economics at the University of Washington
- Yoram Bauman (born 1973), American economist and stand-up comedian
- Yoram Ben-Porat (1937–1992), Israeli economist and president of the Hebrew University of Jerusalem
- Yoram Chaiter (born 1964), physician, cancer researcher and bass singer
- Yoram Danziger (born 1953), Justice of the Supreme Court of Israel, appointed to the Court in 2007
- Yoram Dinstein (1936–2024), Israeli President of Tel Aviv University
- Yoram Dori (born 1950), strategic advisor to Shimon Peres when the latter was President of Israel
- Yoram Globus (born 1943), Israeli director and producer, most famous for his association with Cannon Films Inc
- Yoram Gross (1926–2015), Australian producer of children's and family entertainment
- Yoram Hazony (born 1964), Israeli scholar and founder of Shalem College in Jerusalem
- Yoram Ish-Hurwitz (born 1968), Dutch pianist of Israeli origin
- Yoram Kaniuk (1930–2013), Israeli writer, painter, journalist, and theater critic
- Yoram Kochavy (born 1962), Israeli former Olympic swimmer
- Yoram Marciano (born 1964), Israeli Labor politician
- Yoram Moses, 1997 Gödel laureate and Associate Professor at the Technion - Israel Institute of Technology
- Yoram Schweitzer (fl. 1980s onwards), senior research fellow at Israel's Institute for National Security Studies (INSS)

== See also ==
- Jehoram (disambiguation)
