= Yoran =

Yoran is a surname. Notable people with the surname include:

- Amit Yoran (1970–2025), American businessman
- Hanan Yoran, Israeli historian
- Shalom Yoran (1925–2013), Israeli memoirist

== See also ==
- Yoram (disambiguation page)
