= Leonid Peshkin =

Russian scientist

Leon Peshkin
- Born: 1970 (age 55–56); Moscow, Soviet Union
- Education: Moscow Technological University (MIREA); Weizmann Institute of Science; Brown University; MIT
- Scientific career
- Workplaces: Harvard Medical School
- Thesis: Reinforcement learning by policy search (2002)
- Doctoral advisor: Leslie Kaelbling
- Other academic advisors: Shimon Ullman

Leonid Leon Peshkin (born 1970) is a scientist working at the Systems Biology Department at Harvard Medical School. Peshkin's research interests include embryology, evolution and aging.

== Early life and education ==
Born in Moscow, Peshkin graduated from the Moscow's "Lyceum Vtoraya Shkola" (Russian: Лице́й «Втора́я шко́ла») with advanced program in math and physics. He earned his B.Sc. in Applied Mathematics from Moscow Technological University (MIREA). He went on to receive an M.S. in Applied Mathematics from the Weizmann Institute of Science in 1995 under Shimon Ullman.

Peshkin moved to the US in 1995 to study towards a PhD in Artificial Intelligence Brown University. He ultimately followed his PhD advisor Leslie Kaelbling to the MIT AI lab where he worked on his dissertation “Reinforcement Learning via Policy Search”. He received his Ph.D. in 2002 under Kaelbling.

== Research ==
Leon's research and personal story was covered in a recent Boston Globe article. Peshkin's research in systems biology was covered in press releases from HMS. Leon's research on applications of Artificial Intelligence to biology of aging has been highlighted in an interview with the Life Extension Advocacy Foundation. Efforts to develop an open source platform for testing life- and health-span interventions in Daphnia are discussed in an interview with the Longevity Technology portal. BioIT World covers Peshkin's "radically open science" approaches and longevity research.

== Standard Human Genome ==
Peshkin family contribution as genomic standard for the Genome in a Bottle program was also cover by Genome magazine. In 2022, it was reported that the Telomere-to-Telomere (T2T) consortium had created a complete human genome with almost no gaps, using a haploid cell line and Peshkin's Y chromosome.

== Burglary ==
On March 17, 2011, Peshkin encountered a burglar at his home in Cambridge, MA. The burglar bit Peshkin on the wrist before being subdued and entering police custody. The incident was covered by the local press.
