= Timeline of the 2006 Lebanon War (late August) =

This is a timeline of the 2006 Lebanon War during late August.

== 20 August ==
United Nations
- UN Secretary General Kofi Annan expressed his deep concern over the Israeli commando raid deep inside Lebanon on 19 August, calling it a truce violation. Israeli Prime Minister Olmert is reported to have defended the raid during a later conversation with the Secretary General. The statement also cited the U.N. Interim Force in Lebanon as saying there have "also been several air violations by Israeli military aircraft."
- A contingent of 150 French soldiers sailed from the French port of Toulon, to join the 50 French soldiers who arrived in Lebanon 19 August.
- Lebanon faces a critical test in the coming days that will determine whether the country emerges as a strong democracy or finds itself plunged back into violence, U.N. Envoy Terje Roed Larsen said. "As we see it, Lebanon is now facing colossal opportunities," Roed-Larsen told reporters. "There is a golden opportunity for Lebanon to solidify its democracy, to assert it authority, to produce a situation where Lebanon can be reconstructed and where Lebanese can live peacefully with its neighbors in prosperity. All this is at hand." Roed-Larsen noted approvingly that Lebanese troops have deployed in the south, where they are charged with ensuring that Hezbollah militia do not launch rockets across the border into northern Israel. Despite the "huge potential upside," Lebanon and the region also face a danger, he said. "We're at the tilting edge still, and this can easily start sliding again and lead us quickly into the abyss of violence and bloodshed. This is why diplomacy is so important." Roed Larsen described his meetings since 18 August with Lebanese leaders as "encouraging," and said they were committed to implementing Security Council Resolution 1701, which requires that Israeli troops withdraw from south Lebanon at the same time that Lebanese army troops and a beefed-up U.N. force of 15,000 troops enter the area. He said 3,000 of a planned complement of 15,000 Lebanese soldiers have already been deployed along Lebanon's southern border, though their success in stabilizing the region is by no means guaranteed. "Of course, the devil is in the details here," he said. "It's the nitty-gritty which can make us fail." Roed Larsen made no mention of Israeli Defense Minister Amir Peretz's comment that Israel will not allow Lebanese troops to deploy within two kilometers (1.25 miles) of the Israeli border unless they are accompanied by U.N. forces. Roed Larsen's delegation was to depart for Israel.
- A "vanguard force" of 3,000 to 3,500 U.N. troops is not expected to arrive until later in the week, at the earliest. They would support about 2,000 observers already on the ground as part of the U.N. Interim Force in Lebanon. Roed Larsen predicted that the coming weeks and months would require "very demanding diplomatic work," including "cooperation from Iran and Syria." Another 2,000 Lebanese soldiers—the first complement of an expected 8,600—have been deployed along the country's eastern border with Syria, and as many as 1,000 have been deployed along the coast, he said. The troops are expected to pave the way for a reconfigured and beefed-up UNIFIL in the south. A mechanism has been set up for both forces to work together, Roed-Larsen said, with Lebanese Prime Minister Fouad Siniora agreeing with UNIFIL force commander Gen. Alain Pellegrini to meet weekly with top security officials from both forces.
- Vijay Nambiar, special adviser to Secretary-General Kofi Annan, predicted UNIFIL's rules of engagement will be made public in the next few days. "We expect that will generate interest among the major contributing countries to commit troops in more concrete terms," he said. He described Israel's attack 19 August in Lebanon's Bekaa Valley as "unhelpful, to put it understated."
Lebanon
- Lebanon's Prime Minister, Fouad Siniora, called the Israel raid a "naked violation" of the six-day-old UN truce. The Lebanese Defence Minister, Elias Murr, stated that he "might be forced to ask the cabinet early next week to halt the army deployment in the south".
- Lebanese Defense Minister Elias Murr said Hezbollah was committed to the cease-fire, and he warned that any group that fired on Israel would be considered treacherous for giving Israel a pretext to strike. "Any rocket that is fired from the Lebanese territory would be considered collaboration with Israel," he told a news conference. He threatened to halt the deployment of his country's troops in the wake of Israel's raidif the United Nations did not ensure Israel was abiding by U.N. Resolution 1701.
- U.N. Envoy Terje Roed Larsen said that Lebanon faces a critical test in the coming days that will determine whether the country emerges as a strong democracy or finds itself plunged back into violence. "As we see it, Lebanon is now facing colossal opportunities," Roed-Larsen told reporters. "There is a golden opportunity for Lebanon to solidify its democracy, to assert it authority, to produce a situation where Lebanon can be reconstructed and where Lebanese can live peacefully with its neighbors in prosperity. All this is at hand." Despite the "huge potential upside," Lebanon and the region also face a danger, he said. "We're at the tilting edge still and this can easily start sliding again and lead us quickly into the abyss of violence and bloodshed. This is why diplomacy is so important." Roed-Larsen noted approvingly that Lebanese troops have deployed in the south, where they are charged with ensuring that Hezbollah forces do not launch rockets across the border into northern Israel.
- Lebanese Justice Minister Charles Rizk said he did not agree with U.S. President Bush's description 18 August of Hezbollah as "a force of instability." "Our view is that we should solve the problem of Hezbollah, the Hezbollah resistance and the Hezbollah weapons at its roots," Rizk told. "And the root is the Israeli occupation." Israel pulled out of southern Lebanon in 2000, but disputes remain over the Shebaa Farms, a roughly 30-square-kilometer (12 sq mi) stretch of land. Lebanon claims it as Lebanese territory, but the United Nations recognizes it as Syrian terrain.
- The Lebanese government's Higher Relief Commission said 1,183 Lebanese people were killed in the 34-day war between Israel and Hezbollah, and 4,054 were wounded. The commission estimated that nearly 90 percent of the displaced population had returned to their homes by 20 August, four days after the cessation of hostilities. The U.N. High Commissioner for Refugees said it is shifting its focus to providing shelter for those people whose homes have been destroyed in south Lebanon. Of the 180,000 Lebanese who had sought shelter in Syria, more than 107,000 had returned to Lebanon, the UNHCR said.
Israel
- Israel will not allow Lebanese troops to deploy within two kilometers (1.25 miles) of the Israeli border unless they are accompanied by U.N. forces, Israeli Defense Minister Amir Peretz's office told.
- Israeli Foreign Ministry spokesman Mark Regev told that the Israelis were entitled to act in Boudai. "We were seeing the transfer of illicit weapons" from Syria, he said. "That's a clear violation" of Resolution 1701. Asked why Israel did not complain to the Security Council instead of acting unilaterally, Regev said the world body would not have acted fast enough to keep the arms from being transferred into Lebanon. "I would remind the prime minister of Lebanon that it's his obligation under U.N. Resolution 1701 to be there on the border of Syria to prevent this illicit weapons transfer," he said. Regev described as "speculation" a suggestion that the Israelis may have been searching for Israeli soldiers kidnapped last month by Hezbollah or looking for a leader of Hezbollah to capture or kill.
- Israel has put its death toll from fighting and Hezbollah's rocket attacks at 159, with more than 1,000 Israelis wounded. More than a million people fled their homes in the north to shelters in the south during the war, Israeli officials said.
Hezbollah
- Jumpy Hezbollah fighters flooded Boudai, brandishing Kalashnikovs and stopping, searching, and questioning outsiders the day after the town fought off an Israeli commando raid with a 90-minute shootout. In the town center, the Husseini Community Center lay in rubble, hit by an Israeli strike in the first week of the war. Dozens of Hezbollah sympathizers gathered nearby, on the third day of mourning for Hezbollah fighter Mohammed Ahmed Asef, who was buried here. Speculation was that Mohammed Yazbeck, a member of the Shura Council, had been in Boudai for that funeral. Hezbollah gunmen, skittish about a visiting reporter, stopped her car on three occasions, demanding identification and searching the vehicle. At one point visitors were detained for 30 minutes during a flurry of phone calls among the gunmen. In the end, they were ordered to leave the area.

== 21 August ==
United States
- George W. Bush called for an effective international force in Lebanon to ensure Hezbollah doesn't re-arm and "wreak havoc in the region." "The need is urgent," Bush said. "The international community must now designate the leadership of this new international force and give it robust rules of engagement and deploy it as soon as possible to secure the peace," said Bush, speaking at the beginning of a Washington news conference morning. "Our nation is wasting no time in helping the people of Lebanon," Bush said, detailing U.S. efforts to get humanitarian aid, including food and energy, into Lebanon. Bush also announced aid for rebuilding homes and schools in Lebanon, and he announced aid to help Israeli civilians recover from Hezbollah rocket strikes. Bush cited Iranian support for Hezbollah, which the U.S. considers a terrorist organization, as one example of why Iran cannot be permitted to have nuclear weapons capability. "Iran is obviously part of the problem," Bush said. "They sponsor Hezbollah. They encourage a radical brand of Islam. Imagine how difficult this issue would be if Iran had a nuclear weapon. At the request of Lebanon and Israel, the United States will not contribute troops, President Bush said. Many in Lebanon view the United States as a proxy for Israel, and would not want U.S. participation in the force. Furthermore he announced additional humanitarian aid of $230 million. "There will be another resolution coming into the United Nations giving further instructions to the international force. First things first will be to get the rules of engagement clear," he said. Bush repeated his desire to see France make a greater contribution. "France has had a very close relationship with Lebanon," Bush said during his press conference. "There's historical ties with Lebanon. I would hope they would put more troops in. They understand the region as well as anybody."
- The United States is planning to introduce a new UN resolution on disarming Hezbollah in southern Lebanon, but U.S. Ambassador John Bolton said this should not hold up the quick deployment of UN peacekeepers. "I think the initial force can be deployed now," Bolton told reporters. "We want the disarming of Hezbollah to be accomplished rapidly so that the democratically elected government of Lebanon can establish full control over its territory." Bolton also said that Annan may visit some Middle East countries, including Syria, but his travel schedule was under discussion. He said the new resolution on Lebanon would expand and adjust Resolution 1701, adopted unanimously by the 15-nation council on 11 August, which brought an end to hostilities between Israel and Hezbollah. "It is a dangerous situation and the ceasefire is fragile," Bolton said following a closed-door meeting of the council to discuss implementation of Resolution 1701. He said unless Hezbollah is disarmed, UN, Lebanese and Israeli troops would be vulnerable. "The reluctance is understandable," he added. The inability to generate a force has raised concerns that the fragile ceasefire could fall apart.
Italy
- Iran wants Italy to negotiate the release of two Israel Defense Forces soldiers, Eldad Regev and Ehud Goldwasser, who are alive but not in "great" condition following their kidnapping by Hezbollah last month, an Italian senator told Reuters. Sergio De Gregorio, head of Italy's Senate defense committee, said Iran's national security chief Ali Larijani had told him personally that he would ask Hezbollah, which is backed by Iran and Syria, to negotiate with Italy. "It appears that they [the soldiers] are in good condition, but not great. They are alive," De Gregorio told Reuters in an interview. He did not elaborate about the circumstances of the conversation. He said Iran preferred that any hostage negotiations take place with Italy's military intelligence agency, SISMI, or, as a second choice, with Italy's Foreign Minister Massimo D'Alema. Italy is one of Iran biggest trading partners. If confirmed, the negotiating role would put Italy in a privileged position – especially after Israel's request that Italian forces lead an international peacekeeping force in southern Lebanon. "Italy has excellent relations with Israel and good relations with Iran, as we are the top trade partner," De Gregorio said. "So it could be a great hinge between Israel and Iran, between Israel and Hezbollah, let's say, even if the spiritual leader of Hezbollah is in Iran."
- Italian Prime Minister Romano Prodi said that he has informed United Nations Secretary-General Kofi Annan that Italy is ready to lead the multinational peacekeeping force in Lebanon. Speaking near his holiday home in Tuscany, Prodi told reporters that Annan would take a final decision on the leadership of the force at the weekend of 27 and 28 August.
United Nations
- A new Security Council resolution could help break the impasse over getting an expanded UN force on the ground quickly. Countries that are potential troop contributors have expressed concern about the rules of engagement – and exactly what troops would be required to do, especially regarding the disarming of Hezbollah.
- U.S. Ambassador to the United Nations John Bolton acknowledged that many countries are wary of participating in an international peacekeeping force in southern Lebanon because of the danger. There's no doubt about "the urgency" of deploying a beefed-up U.N. presence to the region, a step called for in the U.N. resolution, Bolton said. Efforts to create the force are "a work in progress," Bolton said. "The United States has been working very vigorously at all levels to help encourage and facilitate that deployment," he told reporters at the United Nations. Asked why some nations are reluctant, Bolton said, "It's obviously a very dangerous situation. The cease-fire is quite fragile." Nations want to be sure their troops will "have the maximum opportunity to defend themselves," he said. Bolton said it is "a long-standing custom" that both sides can agree to participants in a peacekeeping force. "As long as Hezbollah fighters remain armed," he said, the international peacekeeping force and the Lebanese forces "would be vulnerable." The U.N. plans to send 13,000 additional troops to the region to dramatically strengthen a 2,000-strong observer mission already in place in southern Lebanon.
- U.N. sources said the five men were handed over to the U.N. Interim Force in Lebanon at the Naroura border crossing. Lebanese military officials said the men were then handed over to the Lebanese army.
IDF
- IDF reservists who served in the Spearhead Brigade in Lebanon, sent a petition to Defense Minister Amir Peretz and IDF Chief of Staff Dan Halutz in protest at the handling of the war by the government and senior military officials.
- Israeli troops shot two or three Hezbollah militants in southern Lebanon, the Israel Defense Forces said. An IDF representative said troops fired on militants who were advancing toward the Israeli force in the western portion of southern Lebanon. The IDF said it did not know immediately whether those shot were killed. Since a cease-fire between Israel and the Lebanese militant group Hezbollah went into effect last week, there has been sporadic violence. The U.N. resolution that brought about the cease-fire called for Hezbollah's disarmament south of the Litani River and an end to "offensive" actions by the Israeli military. Israel said it will continue defensive maneuvers.
- Israel released five Lebanese men captured during a commando raid in the Bekaa Valley on 2 August. Israeli, Lebanese and U.N. officials confirmed the release. After 2 August operation, Israel said it had captured five Hezbollah militants at a hospital that was part of a Hezbollah stronghold. But Hezbollah leader Hassan Nasrallah, in a televised address the next day, said Israel has taken five "hostages" and denied the hospital was a Hezbollah base of operations. Residents of the area told they believed the five captives were civilians. Israel said it had intelligence that the hospital was a logistics base for the militant group and may have been sheltering a senior leader. Israel said it found weapons at the scene and other evidence that Hezbollah used the site as a stronghold.
Israel
- Defense Minister Amir Peretz backtracked on a proposal to negotiate with Syria. "At present, conditions are not ripe for it, but I certainly see dialogue with Syria in the future," Peretz said during a meeting in Jerusalem with UN special envoy Terje Roed Larsen. Peretz had voiced the proposal for talks with Syria shortly after the cease-fire agreement with Hezbollah went into effect. "We are not frightened by the thunderous voices coming from Syria," Peretz commented, adding: "We have no interest in heating up the Syrian front, but we will protect ourselves if need be." Prime Minister Ehud Olmert said in response: "Some people say Bashar al-Assad should be embraced. I say clearly: Let's not forget the thousands of missiles that fell here over the past month. They all passed through Damascus."

== 22 August ==
Italy
- Italian Prime Minister Romano Prodi has told U.N. Secretary-General Kofi Annan his country is willing to lead a U.N. peacekeeping force in southern Lebanon. "I have confirmed the willingness of Italy to take command of the mission in Lebanon." the prime minister said, according to his office. Prodi's office said that both the Lebanese and Israeli governments had contacted Rome about taking a leadership role in the U.N. force.
- Italy plans to contribute 2,000 to 3,000 troops to the UN peacekeeping force in Lebanon provided Israel does not violate the UN-brokered cease-fire. Italy is expected to lead the force and Foreign Minister Massimo D'Alema called for a special meeting of European Union foreign ministers as early as 25 August in Brussels to sort out how many troops other EU nations would contribute. EU President Finland has invited UN chief Kofi Annan to attend the meeting on 25 August. "How many boots [are there] from other countries? That's the answer that matters," said Defence Minister Arturo Parisi. D'Alema estimated that Italy's commitment – the biggest so far by any nation – would represent about one third of the total sent from Europe. That would put the European contingent at anywhere from 6,000 to 9,000 troops in a force authorized by the United Nations to total up to 15,000. European contingents are considered vital if the United Nations is to assemble an advance party of 3,500 troops by 2 September.
- Ahead of talks on 24 August with his Israeli counterpart, D'Alema said that even Italy would be unable to send troops to Lebanon as long as Israel "keeps shooting." "From Israel, we expect a renewed effort, this time truly binding, to respect the cease-fire," D'Alema told La Repubblica newspaper, two days after Israel asked Italy to lead the force. "It's fair to expect that Hezbollah put down their weapons, but we cannot send our troops to Lebanon if the [Israeli] army keeps shooting." Beyond Italy, European troops would also come from Spain, Belgium and the Netherlands. D'Alema held out hope that France might reconsider its offer of only 200 troops. It had originally been expected to contribute at least 2,000. "In the end I think that even the French will be present in a more hefty fashion," he said. "Even if France does not reconsider it, we will go ahead anyway." He said Germany would contribute financial resources and "mezzi," a vague word in Italian which could mean anything from land vehicles to aircraft. He also said Germany could offer specialist teams on the ground. Greece said that its contribution to the 15,000-strong expanded United Nations Interim Force in Lebanon (UNIFIL) will include a frigate, a helicopter, landing craft, special forces and support staff. Its main purpose will be to inspect shipping to Lebanese ports. The force is unlikely, however, to include any ground troops.
- A diplomat from Finland said efforts were being made this week to firm up the European commitment. "We will try to maximize the EU contribution, we hope [for] a show of solidarity from the member states," he said. D'Alema will meet Foreign Minister Tzipi Livni in Rome on 24 August to discuss the peacekeeping effort. The dangers of the mission for Italian troops have sparked warnings from the center-right opposition that it could prove a "kamikaze" mission, with the peacekeepers sandwiched between Israel and the well-armed Hezbollah.
United Nations
- The United Nations special envoy to Syria and Lebanon said it could take the Lebanese army and international troops two to three months to fill a "security vacuum" in southern Lebanon and warned that "unintended" acts could spark renewed fighting. "There is now a security vacuum which the Lebanese government is trying to fill" with the help of international forces, said Terje Roed Larsen. "But I think realistically, up to a point, you will have such a vacuum in Lebanon for the next two, three months," he added. "The situation is still extremely fragile... Unintended incidents can kick off renewed violence, which might escalate and spin out of control."
- The peacekeepers deployed in Lebanon will likely have the right to open fire to defend themselves and to protect civilians, but will be barred from actively searching for Hezbollah weapons, a French report said. Le Monde newspaper said it had obtained a copy of a 21-page document laying out the provisional rules of engagement for the force, newly strengthened under a UN Security Council resolution. The document, not yet approved, was stamped "UN Restricted," the newspaper said. The Foreign Ministry did not immediately respond to calls seeking confirmation. The document cited in Le Monde did not apparently satisfy European countries, as it was distributed to all potential contributor countries 18 August, according to the report. Under the terms currently being discussed, the peacekeepers would operate mostly defensively, though they would be cleared to "use appropriate and credible force ... if necessary," Le Monde said, citing the document. The force would be authorized to prevent hostile activities in a buffer zone in southern Lebanon; to counter anyone who tries to prevent peacekeepers from carrying out their mandate; and to "protect civilians in immediate threat of physical violence," Le Monde said, citing the document.
- UN envoy Terje Roed Larsen said that there were indications from senior Lebanese officials that they would request help in monitoring the crossings and that the international community would heed any such requests. He said about 2,000 Lebanese forces had deployed along the border with Syria. UN Security Council Resolution 1701 establishing the cease-fire also demands that Lebanon's borders be demarcated, particularly to solve a dispute over the Sheeba Farms near the border between Lebanon, Israel and Syria.
European Union
- The European Union Political and Security Committee met in emergency session to iron out Europe's contribution to UNIFIL, which is being cobbled together following UN Security Council Resolution agreed to earlier this month, which called for a ceasefire in the month-long conflict between Israel and Hezbollah.
IDF
- Israeli troops in southern Lebanon have been handing over territory seized in the conflict to the U.N. Interim Force in Lebanon (UNIFIL) as Lebanese army troops move into the region for the first time in decades.
Israel
- Israel wants UN troops to police border crossings between Lebanon and Syria to prevent weapons smuggling. Prime Minister Ehud Olmert said stationing some of the international force at border crossings and Beirut airport would enable Israel to lift its air and sea blockade of Lebanon.
Syria
- Syrian President Bashar al-Assad rejected Israeli demands for the deployment of international troops on the Lebanese-Syrian border to stop what Israel says is the smuggling of arms to Hezbollah. "There will be no drawing of the border in the Shebaa Farms before the Israeli forces leave it," Assad said. "Hezbollah's victory was enough to teach Israel a lesson, that the isolation of Syria has failed and that anyone who tries to isolate Syria isolates himself from basic issues."

== 23 August ==
Pakistan
- Pakistan and Jordan have strongly demanded the immediate withdrawal of Israeli troops from Lebanon and urged the world community to support Beirut in regaining full control over the war-torn south. This resolve emerged after a meeting between President Pervez Musharraf and visiting Jordanian King Abdullah. The two leaders held one on one talks and later were joined by their aides. The leaders discussed the Middle East situation and condemned Israel's brazen aggression. The recent crisis in Lebanon underscores the necessity of achieving a just, lasting and comprehensive resolution to the Palestinian–Israeli conflict," a press statement from the presidential palace quoted him as saying after the talks. Abdallah said he hoped the international community would help the Lebanese government "in extending its sovereignty and its control over all of its borders by ensuring the withdrawal of Israeli forces from Lebanon and finding a comprehensive solution toward a permanent cease-fire," the statement said. Musharraf urged the international community and the Organisation of the Islamic Conference (OIC) to extend generous help to both Lebanon and the Palestinian Authority for their rebuilding and rehabilitation efforts. "Loss of a large number of innocent lives and massive destruction in Lebanon as a result of the flagrant Israeli offensive has caused us deep anguish and despair," Musharraf added. Pakistan, which does not recognize the Jewish state, says it would consider participation in a UN force in south Lebanon if its troops were "welcomed" by all parties to the conflict.
Syria
- "The deployment of international troops on the Lebanese-Syrian border to stop what Israel says is the smuggling of arms to Hezbollah would be a withdrawal of Lebanese sovereignty and a hostile position," Bashar al-Assad said, according to advance excerpts of an interview to be aired by Dubai Television. Assad considers the deployment of international troops along the Lebanon-Syria border a hostile move toward his country, the Associated Press reported. "First, this means creating hostile conditions between Syria and Lebanon," Assad told Dubai Television, according to excerpts released by the TV station ahead of the interview's airing late in the day. "Second, it is a hostile move toward Syria and naturally it will create problems.""The deployment of U.N. troops along his country's border negates the sovereignty of Lebanon," Al-Assad said in an interview with Dubai TV. "No country in the world accepts having soldiers of another nationality patrolling its border." "They are taking sovereignty away from the Lebanese government and giving it to other forces while they talk about spreading that sovereignty," he said. "This is a hostile position towards Syria and will naturally create problems between Syria and Lebanon."Finnish Foreign Minister Erkki Tuomioja said he was told by his Syrian counterpart, Walid Al-Moualem, that Syria would close its border with Lebanon if the additional U.N. force is deployed there. Lebanon's only land borders are with Syria and Israel. The Lebanese-Israeli border has been closed since war broke out in July between Israel and Hezbollah militants, so a Syrian closure would cut off all land access to Lebanon. The Lebanese government has accepted the U.N. deployment, which is part of a cease-fire deal that ended hostilities on 14 August. Under that agreement, the U.N. force is supposed to help the Lebanese army secure the country's borders, in part to prevent resupply of Hezbollah. The 15,000 new troops will augment a small U.N. force already on the ground and Lebanese troops that are already being sent into southern Lebanon, a longtime Hezbollah stronghold. Al-Assad ended Syria's nearly 30-year military occupation of Lebanon in April 2005, after a wave of unrest and anti-Syrian protests sparked by the assassination of Lebanon's former prime minister, Rafik Hariri. Syria withdrew from Lebanon 2005, but it still exerts leverage through local parties, including Hizbollah, the dominant organisation in Shia Muslim villages and neighbourhoods.
Lebanon
- Lebanon's prime minister urged the US to "put pressure on Israel" to end the air and sea blockade that has persisted since the end of the war 10 days ago. Fouad Siniora said American help would be appreciated for reconstruction in the wake of the 34-day war between Lebanese Hizbollah militiamen and the Israeli military, which devastated key infrastructure and thousands of homes. "The US can do more on the level of financial assistance, and the US can do much more on the level of political assistance to Lebanon," Mr Siniora said. The prime minister welcomed US President George W. Bush's promise 21 August of a post-war aid package worth $230m (€180m, £122m). "I requested details," Mr Siniora said, adding that Lebanon would continue lobbying US Congress members for "larger assistance". Gulf Arab governments have made larger pledges, and more is expected from other international donors in the days ahead. But the US government could help most by persuading its ally, Israel, "to lift the siege" that continues to hinder large-scale relief to war-damaged areas, Mr Siniora said. Officials from Mr Siniora's office said the Lebanese government could accept "technical assistance" from unarmed members of the UN Interim Force in Lebanon, Unifil, to better control the flow of goods from Syria. The existing Unifil troops are thus far deployed only along Lebanon's southern border with Israel. The ceasefire gives the Lebanese army – backed by Unifil – a monopoly on military functions in southern Lebanon, including carrying weapons and wearing uniforms.
- Explosions in southern Lebanon—apparently caused by leftover Israeli ordnance—killed an Israeli soldier and three Lebanese soldiers in separate incidents. The Lebanese soldiers were trying to dismantle unexploded ordnance when the explosives detonated and killed three, according to the Lebanese army. Two mines exploded overnight in southern Lebanon, killing one Israeli soldier and wounding three others, two seriously, Israel Defense Forces said. According to the Israeli daily, Haaretz, the incident apparently happened when the soldiers' tank ran over an old Israeli military mine.
Israel
- Israel's prime minister, Ehud Olmert, said the blockade would continue until international peacekeepers were positioned at the Beirut airport and along Lebanon's border with Syria. That north-eastern border is regarded as the main route of entry for Iranian-supplied weapons used by Hizbollah. Israeli Foreign Minister Tzipi Livni called the situation in Lebanon "explosive" and pressed the international community to work quickly to deploy peacekeeping troops, the AP reported.
- Mark Regev, the spokesman for Israel's Foreign Ministry, categorically rejected the claim by Amnesty International that Israel had "acted outside international norms or international legality concerning the rules of war." Unlike Hezbollah, he said, Israel did not target the civilian population, nor did it indiscriminately target Lebanese civilian infrastructure. He added: “Our job was made very difficult by the fact that Hezbollah adopted a deliberate policy of positioning itself inside civilian areas and breaking the first fundamental distinction under the rules of war, by deliberately endangering civilians. Under the rules of war, you are legally entitled to target infrastructure that your enemy is exploiting for its military campaign."
Hezbollah
- Fears about Hizbollah's continued ability to start a war with Israel have held up efforts to form the new, more "robust" Unifil, meant to expand from 2,000 to as many as 15,000 troops under the UN-brokered ceasefire. Yet Hizbollah's fighters are still openly armed and uniformed in other Shia areas, such as Beirut's southern suburbs and the Bekaa Valley, near Syria.
European Union
- European Union foreign ministers are to discuss possible troop contributions at a meeting on 25 August in Brussels. Mr Siniora said he hoped for a greater commitment from France, which has only sent an additional 200 military engineers, but added that Lebanon "greatly appreciates" Italy's offer to take the lead and send 3,000 troops. The Lebanese government would listen to European concerns about the rules of engagement for the peacekeeping force, he said.
United Nations
- U.N. Secretary-General Kofi Annan will head for the Middle East 25 August to push for the cease-fire agreement between Israel and Hezbollah militants in Lebanon. Annan will visit Israel, Lebanon, Qatar, Turkey, Saudi Arabia, Egypt, Jordan, Syria and Iran and will talk with the Palestinian Authority. "The focus of the trip" will be implementation of U.N. Resolution 1701, Annan's spokesman Stéphane Dujarric told reporters. "If other issues come up, they come up," he added. The commander of U.N. peacekeepers in Lebanon described the cease-fire between Israel and Hezbollah as "very fragile" and "dangerous" and said that an expanded international force would not disarm Hezbollah, The Associated Press reported. "The Israelis cannot ask UNIFIL United Nations Interim Force in Lebanon to disarm Hezbollah. This is not written in our mandate," French Maj. Gen. Alain Pellegrini, commander of the 2,000-member force, told reporters at UNIFIL headquarters in the coastal town of Naqoura, according to AP. Annan will head to the region after meeting with European Union leaders in Brussels on 25 August about the EU's troop contribution to southern Lebanon.
- The United Nations Development Programme said the attacks had obliterated most of the progress Lebanon had made in recovering from the devastation of the civil war years. "Fifteen years of work have been wiped out in a month," Jean Fabre, a spokesman for the organization in Geneva, told reporters. Another urgent issue, aid groups say, is the number of unexploded bomblets from cluster bombs littering the southern villages. Tekimiti Gilbert, the operations chief of a United Nations mine removal team, told reporters in Tyre: "Up to now there are at least 170 cluster bomb strikes in south Lebanon. It's a huge problem. There are obvious dangers with people, children, cars. People are tripping over these things." United Nations officials say at least five children have been killed by picking up the bomblets scattered about by the cluster bombs.
- A report released by the United Nations Mine Action Coordination Center, which has personnel in Lebanon searching for unexploded ordnance, said it had found unexploded bomblets, including hundreds of American types, in 249 locations south of the Litani River. The report said American munitions found included 559 M-42s, an anti-personnel bomblet used in 105-millimeter artillery shells; 663 M-77s, a submunition found in M-26 rockets; and 5 BLU-63s, a bomblet found in the CBU-26 cluster bomb. Also found were 608 M-85s, an Israeli-made submunition. The unexploded submunitions being found in Lebanon are probably only a fraction of the total number dropped. Cluster munitions can contain dozens or even hundreds of submunitions designed to explode as they scatter around a wide area. They are very effective against rocket-launcher units or ground troops.
Italy
- Italian Prime Minister Romano Prodi said his country's troops are prepared to lead the multinational force once the composition is determined and their role is clearly defined. He told he believes it is "urgent" that a decision be made soon, because the cease-fire between Israel and Hezbollah is fragile. Israel has said it won't withdraw from Lebanon until the international forces arrive. "I trust their statement," the prime minister said. Prodi said he has made it clear to Annan that all members of the Security Council should not only politically endorse the effort, but also offer troops.
Amnesty International
- Amnesty International accused Israel of war crimes in its monthlong battle with Hezbollah, saying its bombing campaign amounted to indiscriminate attacks on Lebanon's civilian infrastructure and population. "Many of the violations examined in this report are war crimes that give rise to individual criminal responsibility," Amnesty International, the London-based human rights group, said in a report on the Israeli campaign. "They include directly attacking civilian objects and carrying out indiscriminate or disproportionate attacks." "During more than four weeks of ground and aerial bombardment by the Israeli armed forces, the country's infrastructure suffered destruction on a catastrophic scale," the report said, contending that this was "an integral part of the military strategy." "Israeli forces pounded buildings into the ground," the report went on, "reducing entire neighborhoods to rubble and turning villages and towns into ghost towns as their inhabitants fled the bombardments. "Main roads, bridges and petrol stations were blown to bits. Entire families were killed in airstrikes on their homes or in their vehicles while fleeing the aerial assaults on their villages. Scores lay buried beneath the rubble of their houses for weeks, as the Red Cross and other rescue workers were prevented from accessing the areas by continuing Israeli strikes." Citing a variety of sources, the Amnesty International report said Israel's air force had carried out more than 7,000 air attacks, while the navy had fired 2,500 shells. The human toll, according to Lebanese government statistics, was estimated at 1,183 deaths, mostly civilians, about a third of them children; 4,054 wounded; and 970,000 people displaced, out of a population of a little under four million. "Statements from the Israeli military officials seem to confirm that the destruction of the infrastructure was indeed a goal of the military campaign," the report said. It said that "in village after village the pattern was similar: the streets, especially main streets, were scarred with artillery craters along their length. In some cases, cluster bomb impacts were identified." "Houses were singled out for precision-guided missile attacks and were destroyed, totally or partially, as a result," the report said. "Business premises such as supermarkets or food stores and auto service stations and petrol stations were targeted. "With the electricity cut off and food and other supplies not coming into the villages, the destruction of supermarkets and petrol stations played a crucial role in forcing local residents to leave." The Amnesty International report said the widespread destruction of apartments, houses, electricity and water services, roads, bridges, factories and ports, in addition to several statements by Israeli officials, suggested a policy of punishing the Lebanese government and the civilian population in an effort to get them to turn against Hezbollah. "The evidence strongly suggests that the extensive destruction of public works, power systems, civilian homes and industry was a deliberate and integral part of the military strategy rather than collateral damage," the report said. It also noted a statement from the Israeli military chief of staff, Lt. Gen Dan Halutz, calling Hezbollah a "cancer" that Lebanon must get rid of "because if they don't, their country will pay a very high price." The Amnesty International report came as a number of international aid and human rights agencies used the current lull in fighting to assess the damage."
IDF
- The Israeli military said it had fired artillery rounds from the disputed territory of Shebaa Farms to the Lebanese village of Shebaa. There were no reports of casualties.

== 24 August ==
France
- President Jacques Chirac of France increased his country's commitment of troops to Lebanon amid mounting criticism that France had failed to do enough to police a cease-fire that it had helped broker. In a televised address, Mr. Chirac said France would contribute two battalions, bringing the number of French soldiers on the ground in Lebanon to 2,000, after obtaining guarantees from the United Nations on how the forces would operate. At the same time, Mr. Chirac repeated a French offer to lead the mission. "France is ready, if the United Nations wishes it, to continue to command this force," Mr. Chirac said, adding that the numbers of troops could be revised over the next six months." Mr. Chirac said, "In a situation where everyone is weighing up the difficulty, France will assume its responsibilities in Lebanon." Europe is under pressure to commit troops in part because contributions from some countries that are predominantly Muslim are unacceptable to Israel. But doubts persist as to whether the Europeans are prepared to match their calls for peace in the Middle East with the necessary military commitment. Mr. Chirac called for a fair division of labor in creating a peacekeeping force. "I have talked to my colleagues in order to convince them to play their part in this," he said. Another reason for caution among the Europeans, and the French in particular, is their bloody history in recent peacekeeping operations. France lost soldiers during peacekeeping operations in Bosnia and in Rwanda 1994. France also lost 58 peacekeepers in an attack by Hezbollah in Beirut in 1983 that also killed 241 Americans. France is ready to send an extra 1,600 troops to bolster a revamped United Nations force for Lebanon, President Jacques Chirac said. France initially offered only to double its force in Lebanon to 400, disappointing many United Nations diplomats who had expected Paris to provide the backbone of the mission. However, France decided to dispatch many more troops after winning assurances from the U.N. that the troops would be able to defend themselves fully if they came under attack and could use force to protect civilians. "Two thousand French troops will thus be placed under the United Nations in Lebanon. France is ready, if the United Nations wishes, to continue commanding this force," Chirac said in his televised address. Chirac has used national broadcasts before to set out his views on international crises, notably on Iraq, and his handling of the Lebanon war has boosted his flagging popularity. Before this address, he chaired a meeting with Prime Minister Dominique de Villepin and the ministers of foreign affairs, defense, Europe and the interior. Having taken the lead in diplomatic efforts to end the war in Lebanon, France had been expected to command the new UNIFIL force approved by the U.N. Security Council. Currently, French Maj. Gen. Alain Pellegrini is in command of UNIFIL. CNN- reporter Oakley said Chirac was under pressure to send more troops because the French felt they had a special relationship with Lebanon because they were originally there under a League of Nations—forerunner of the United Nations—mandate. Chirac had also felt usurped by Prodi's pledge, said Oakley. "France played a major role in pushing for a cease-fire resolution, but this would never have come about without a commitment to an international peacekeeping force," he said. "They were under pressure to be seen to do more. Chirac justified the extra commitment by saying the rules of engagement of the U.N. peacekeeping force and chains of command had now been clarified. I think the EU foreign ministers will be also pressing Annan to further clarify those rules of engagement. "Interesting diplomatic arm-wrestling has been going on behind the scenes. The Italians were keen to establish their credentials with the Arab world as Prodi believes his predecessor Silvio Berlusconi made a big mistake in backing U.S.-UK efforts in Iraq. "Prodi expected to have a leadership role in Lebanon: he said he had spoken to Bush, who had been positive. Bush welcomed continued leadership from France so he's playing it both ways."
United Nations
- U.N. humanitarian workers distributed aid to residents in various Lebanese villages damaged by the monthlong Israeli bombardment, the Office of the United Nations High Commissioner for Refugees (UNHCR) said in a statement. A survey of 18 villages in the southeastern Lebanese region of Nabatiye found water shortages, widespread crop failures and a need for basic relief items. Workers handed out blankets, mattresses, tents and other basic living items, the statement said. UNHCR distributed tents to 30 locations near the port city of Tyre. More supplies, including six truckloads of relief items from Syria and four trailer loads from a French ship, are expected to arrive 25 August.
- The Finnish foreign minister, Erkki Tuomioja, whose country holds the rotating presidency of the European Union, said that reinforcements for the United Nations peacekeeping force could be imminent. "We would like to see the first reinforcements for Unifil arrive within a week if possible," Mr. Tuomioja said in Berlin, according to The Associated Press.
United States
- President George W. Bush told the Italian prime minister, Romano Prodi, by telephone that Washington was leaning on other allies to provide troops, and he spoke of his "positive" view of Italy's offer to lead the force.
- The State Department is investigating whether Israel's use of American-made cluster bombs in southern Lebanon violated secret agreements with the United States that restrict when it can employ such weapons, two officials said. The investigation by the department's Office of Defense Trade Controls began this week, after reports that three types of American cluster munitions, anti-personnel weapons that spray bomblets over a wide area, have been found in many areas of southern Lebanon and were responsible for civilian casualties. Gonzalo Gallegos, a State Department spokesman, said, "We have heard the allegations that these munitions were used, and we are seeking more information." He declined to comment further. Several current and former officials said that they doubted the investigation would lead to sanctions against Israel but that the decision to proceed with it might be intended to help the Bush administration ease criticism from Arab governments and commentators over its support of Israel's military operations. The investigation has not been publicly announced; the State Department confirmed it in response to questions. In addition to investigating use of the weapons in southern Lebanon, the State Department has held up a shipment of M-26 artillery rockets, a cluster weapon, that Israel sought during the conflict, the officials said. The inquiry is likely to focus on whether Israel properly informed the United States about its use of the weapons and whether targets were strictly military. So far, the State Department is relying on reports from United Nations personnel and nongovernmental organizations in southern Lebanon, the officials said. David Siegel, a spokesman for the Israeli Embassy, said, "We have not been informed about any such inquiry, and when we are we would be happy to respond." Officials were granted anonymity to discuss the investigation because it involves sensitive diplomatic issues and agreements that have been kept secret for years. The agreements that govern Israel's use of American cluster munitions go back to the 1970s, when the first sales of the weapons occurred, but the details of them have never been publicly confirmed. The first one was signed in 1976 and later reaffirmed in 1978 after an Israeli incursion into Lebanon. News accounts over the years have said that they require that the munitions be used only against organized Arab armies and clearly defined military targets under conditions similar to the Arab-Israeli wars of 1967 and 1973. A Congressional investigation after Israel's 1982 invasion of Lebanon found that Israel had used the weapons against civilian areas in violation of the agreements. In response, the Reagan administration imposed a six-year ban on further sales of cluster weapons to Israel.
- Israeli officials acknowledged soon after their offensive began on 12 July that they were using cluster munitions against rocket sites and other military targets. While Hezbollah positions were frequently hidden in civilian areas, Israeli officials said their intention was to use cluster bombs in open terrain. Bush administration officials warned Israel to avoid civilian casualties, but they have lodged no public protests against its use of cluster weapons. American officials say it has not been not clear whether the weapons, which are also employed by the United States military, were being used against civilian areas and had been supplied by the United States. Israel also makes its own types of cluster weapons. The United Nations reported this week that the number of civilian casualties in Lebanon from cluster munitions, land mines and unexploded bombs stood at 30 injured and eight killed.
- Officials say it is unlikely that Israel will be found to have violated a separate agreement, the Arms Export Control Act, which requires foreign governments that receive American weapons to use them for legitimate self-defense. Proving that Israel's campaign against Hezbollah did not constitute self-defense would be difficult, especially in view of President Bush's publicly announced support for Israel's action after Hezbollah fighters attacked across the border, the officials said. Even if Israel is found to have violated the classified agreement covering cluster bombs, it is not clear what actions the United States might take. In 1982, delivery of cluster-bomb shells to Israel was suspended a month after Israel invaded Lebanon after the Reagan administration determined that Israel "may" have used them against civilian areas. But the decision to impose what amounted to an indefinite moratorium was made under pressure from Congress, which conducted a long investigation of the issue. Israel and the United States reaffirmed restrictions on the use of cluster munitions in 1988, and the Reagan administration lifted the moratorium.
Italy
- "I expect that reluctant or not, smiling or not, there will be an ample European contribution," Mr. Prodi said in an interview with RAI state radio, according to Reuters. "Bush is making a strong effort to put pressure on friendly countries in order to broaden the number of participants in the mission," Mr. Prodi said in a statement. Massimo D'Alema, the Italian foreign minister, suggested in Rome that rules of engagement were already clear enough because the United Nations had authorized the force to use weapons in self-defense and to defend civilians. "If the international forces find themselves confronted with acts of hostility, they should inevitably react with force, as shown by the international mandate," said Mr. D'Alema. "If somebody violates the 'Blue Line' with hostile acts, the international forces should react as foreseen by the rules of engagement," Mr. D'Alema added. Mr. D'Alema pledged Italy's willingness to enforce the United Nations resolution on Lebanon and urged other European Union member states to do the same because the stability of the Middle East should be a chief concern for Europeans. "We are convinced that this could represent a change for the entire region," said Mr. D'Alema at a joint press conference in Rome with the Israeli foreign minister, Tzipi Livni.
Israel
- Israeli foreign minister Ms. Livni said there "is a window of opportunity for a new era in Lebanon and a chance to change the rules of the game." She said that the "interests of Lebanon and Israel are the same as that of the international community."
- The Israeli reserve soldiers' protest which calls for the resignation of Ehud Olmert and the establishment of a national commission of inquiry over failures in the conflict, grows in momentum to reach several hundred, including the influential Movement for Quality Government.
Hezbollah
- Dozen of Israelis were killed and hundreds wounded in attacks by Hezbollah rockets, some of which were loaded with ball bearings to maximize their lethality.

== 25 August ==
European Union
- European countries have pledged to contribute almost 7,000 troops to a U.N. peacekeeping force in Lebanon. After an emergency meeting of European Union foreign ministers in Brussels, France's Foreign Minister Philippe Douste-Blazy said between 6,500 and 7,000 troops would be sent. U.N. Secretary-General Kofi Annan, who attended the meeting, told a news briefing that "more than half the force has been pledged today," referring to a U.N. goal of gathering a total contingent of 15,000. "Europe is providing the backbone to the force," Annan said. Annan said he had asked France to lead the force until the end of February 2007. After that, Italy will provide the next commander.
France
- Earlier, French President Jacques Chirac said he did not believe the U.N. force in Lebanon required 15,000 troops to secure peace in the region and called the figure excessive. "My feeling is that the figure that was put forward at the beginning of discussions – 15,000 for a reinforced UNIFIL – was a figure that was quite excessive," he said at a joint press conference with German Chancellor Angela Merkel. About 170 French troops pulled into the Lebanese port of Naqoura, bringing with them 75 pieces of machinery including trucks, bulldozers and armored personnel carriers. The troops, like the 50 who arrived last week, consist of engineers who will lay the groundwork for additional French troops expected to strengthen the U.N. international force. Rear-Admiral Xavier Magne with the French Navy said they will keep an off-shore ship with an airborne quick reaction force and a hospital. Magne said this was based on lessons learned from the 1980s when French and American barracks came under attack in Lebanon.
United Nations
- Homes, gardens and highways across south Lebanon are littered with unexploded cluster bombs dropped by Israel, the U.N. said, and the U.S. State Department has reportedly launched an investigation. "There are about 285 cluster bomb locations across south Lebanon, and our teams are still doing surveys and adding new locations every day," said Dalya Farran, spokeswoman for the U.N. Mine Action Coordination Center, which has an office in the southern port city of Tyre. The U.N. Mine Action Coordination Center opened a branch in Tyre in 2003, to deal with the issue of land mines. Since the cease-fire, the office has redirected its efforts toward clearing unexploded Israeli bombs from the area. "We find about 30 new locations per day," she said. Since a U.N.-brokered cease-fire took hold 14 August, eight Lebanese have been killed by exploding ordnance, including two children, and 38 people have been wounded, according to a U.N. count. "A lot of them are in civilian areas, on farmland and in people's homes. We're finding a lot at the entrances to houses, on balconies and roofs," Farran said. "Sometimes windows are broken, and they get inside the houses." United Nations demining experts refused to comment on the reported U.S. investigation into whether Israel's use of such weapons might violate American rules, but suggested it violated some aspects of international law. "It's not illegal to use against soldiers or your enemy, but according to Geneva Conventions, it's illegal to use them (cluster bombs) in civilian areas," Farran said. "But it's not up to us to decide if it's illegal – I'm just giving facts and letting others do analysis."
- Belgium said it would supply 302 troops to the U.N. force that will patrol southern Lebanon. Germany, Greece, Spain, Finland and Denmark were set to make similar pledges. Annan, speaking after meeting Belgian Prime Minister Guy Verhofstadt at the meeting in Brussels, said he hoped for more pledges. "I came with the hope that I will leave Brussels with a large number of soldiers," he said, according to The Associated Press. CNN- reporter Oakley said the Spanish prime minister was also set to commit 600 to 800 troops to the force. Germany and Greece were expected to make naval contributions but not troops on the ground. "The big question is whether this U.N. force will develop the necessary momentum and whether the Europeans will produce the 8,000 to 9,000 troops between them that the U.N. hopes for," Oakley added. As of 30 June, UNIFIL was made up of 1,990 troops from China, France, Ghana, India, Ireland, Italy, Poland and Ukraine, according to the U.N. Web site.
- United Nations Security Council Resolution 1701 does not require the deployment of U.N. troops to the border, and the Lebanese army, not the U.N. troops, would be charged with disarming Hezbollah, Annan said. Annan said the cease-fire was holding with few infractions but urged the EU to move swiftly to get its soldiers to region. He said he hoped the expanded force could start deploying in "days, not weeks." He had earlier set a target date of 2 September. Finnish Foreign Minister Erkki Tuomioja, whose country holds the EU's rotating presidency, said the entire U.N. force should be in place within two to three months.
United States
- State Department spokesman Gonzalo Gallegos said that the department was aware of the allegations about the cluster bombs. "We are seeking more information," he said, but he declined to comment further. The State Department's Office of Defense Trade Controls launched an investigation into Israel's use of three types of American weapons, anti-personnel munitions that spray bomblets over a wide area, The New York Times reported. The newspaper quoted several current and former U.S. officials as saying they doubted the probe would lead to sanctions against Israel, but that it might be an effort by the Bush administration to ease Arab criticism of its military support for Israel. The U.S. has also postponed a shipment of M-26 artillery rockets—another cluster weapon—to Israel, the paper said.
- U.S. President George W. Bush said he was pleased with Chirac's decision to send more troops. "This is an important step towards finalizing preparations to deploy the United Nations Interim Force of Lebanon," he said. "I applaud the decision of France, as well as the significant pledges from Italy and our other important allies. I encourage other nations to make contributions as well."
- The United States has ruled out committing troops, but is expected to provide logistics support. As a rule, Washington does not participate in peacekeeping missions unless it is commanding the force.
IDF
- The Israeli army said all the weapons it uses "are legal under international law, and their use conforms with international standards." During the 34-day war between Israel and Hezbollah, Israel said it was forced to hit civilian targets in Lebanon because Hezbollah fighters were using villages as a base for rocket-launchers aimed at Israel. Some 850 Lebanese died in the fighting, compared to 157 Israelis. Lebanon's south is also riddled with land mines, laid by retreating Israeli soldiers who pulled out of the region in 2000 after an 18-year occupation. Hezbollah has also planted mines to ward off Israeli forces. Lebanon has long called for Israel to hand over maps of the minefields.
- Fifty-four percent of the Israelis want army chief Dan Halutz to step down.
Russia
- Russian Defense Minister Sergei Ivanov dismissed claims that Hezbollah has Russian-made Kornet anti-tank missiles. Israel sent a delegation to Russia last week to complain about the missiles that it says were used by Hezbollah in the recent weeks of fighting in Lebanon; the missiles reportedly have been a particularly effective part of Hezbollah's arsenal. But Ivanov said during a trip to the Russian Far East city of Magadan that the reports are "complete nonsense," news agencies reported. "No kind of evidence of Hezbollah having such equipment has been presented to us," Ivanov said, according to the Interfax news agency.
Hezbollah
- They were struggling in a boy band, working the West Bank wedding circuit and dreaming of stardom. Now the five singers who make up the Northern Band have come a little closer to their goal, with help from an unwitting ally—Hezbollah guerrilla chief Hassan Nasrallah. At the height of the Israel-Hezbollah war, the band wrote new lyrics, in praise of Nasrallah, for an old tune. The "Hawk of Lebanon" song tapped into Nasrallah's huge popularity among Palestinians and became an instant hit. The song is being played on Arab TV networks, used as a ring tone for cell phones, passed around on e-mail and distributed on unlicensed CDs and tapes. Music stores have trouble keeping up with demand, in part because Israeli soldiers have confiscated some Nasrallah tapes and CDs at checkpoints. Basking in its newfound success, the band has doubled its fee per performance to 1,000 shekels ($230). At a recent wedding in the town of Ramallah, the band was asked to play the Nasrallah song six times. Lead singer and manager Alaa Abu al-Haija, 28, said he gives the audiences what they want to hear. "I see people turning toward Islam, so I have to sing to that," said Alaa, sitting in the living room of his family's two-story house in the northern West Bank village of Yamoun. The lyrics consist of constant repetition of a few simple rhymes: "Hey, you, hawk of Lebanon. Hey, you, Nasrallah. Your men are from Hezbollah and victory is yours with God's help." Alaa and his two younger brothers and band partners—Nour, 25, and Mohammed, 22—are already working on the next song about Nasrallah. Alaa also wrote the Hamas election song, to the same tune as the Nasrallah anthem, but it never reached the same popularity. Palestinian society is divided, with some pledging loyalty to the Islamic militant Hamas, which took power in March 2006, and others backing the Fatah movement of moderate Palestinian President Mahmoud Abbas. However, Hezbollah fever appears to have united the Palestinians, who feel deep resentment against Israel after 39 years of military occupation, including harsh restrictions on travel, commerce and other aspects of daily life. Many admire Hezbollah for holding off Israel's mighty army—similar to the popular support enjoyed by then-Iraqi leader Saddam Hussein when he fired Scud missiles at Israel in the 1991 Gulf War. "We used to sing for Saddam," said Saed Akrawi, 26, whose perfume shop in downtown Jenin is adorned with a Nasrallah portrait, next to posters of models. "Saddam is gone. We want someone else to sing for."
Israel
- Israeli police spokesman Mickey Rosenfeld said the "Hawk of Lebanon" song is considered inflammatory and that tapes and CDs containing it will be confiscated. He said police in and around Jerusalem have found no copies of the song so far, but that officers have searched music stores and are on the lookout for contraband.
- Sixty-three percent of Israelis want Prime Minister Ehud Olmert to resign in a sharp public rebuke over his handling of the war in Lebanon against Hezbollah, a newspaper poll showed. Many Israelis view a U.N.-brokered cease-fire backed by Olmert as a failure for Israel because Hezbollah's leadership was left standing and the two Israeli soldiers, whose capture by Hezbollah on 12 July sparked the war, were still in captivity. The Yedioth Ahronoth poll showed for the first time a majority favored Olmert stepping down. Several surveys suggested a big jump in support for the right-wing Likud party and its leader Benjamin Netanyahu after the 34-day war. Yedioth, Israel's biggest circulation daily, called the poll results a political "earthquake" for Olmert, whose centrist Kadima party crushed Netanyahu's Likud in general elections in March 2006. A similar poll published showed as of 18 August, 41 percent wanted Olmert to resign. Twenty-two percent of Israelis in the poll deemed Netanyahu "most fit" to be prime minister, compared to 11 percent for Olmert. Olmert also trailed ultranationalist Avigdor Lieberman with 18 percent and senior statesman Shimon Peres with 12 percent, according to Yedioth. A poll in the Maariv newspaper showed that only 14 percent of Israelis would vote for Olmert if new elections were held, while 26 percent would back Netanyahu, a former prime minister. The Yedioth poll said 45 percent would support Netanyahu.
- Olmert, a career politician who lacks the combat credentials of many of his predecessors, has seen his public standing plummet for failing to crush Hezbollah, which rained some 4,000 rockets on northern Israel during the fighting. "Olmert go home," read one sign at a protest by a few hundred army reservists and family members at the grave of former Prime Minister Golda Meir. The protesters urged Olmert to follow the lead set by Meir, who was forced to resign after the 1973 Middle East war in which Egypt and Syria scored initial successes that caused heavy Israeli casualties. Olmert has put on hold for now his proposal for an Israeli pullout from parts of the occupied West Bank. The proposal was the centerpiece of the government program that won him election in March 2006. But resurgent violence in Gaza, which Israel evacuated 2005, plus the Lebanon war appears to have dampened public enthusiasm for territorial withdrawals. The Maariv poll showed 73 percent of Israelis opposed future unilateral withdrawals.
- Cameron Brown, of Israel's Herzliya Center, said Olmert's political troubles were compounded by a string of government scandals, including an investigation into whether the Israeli president coerced a female employee to have sex with him."These politicians are under fire from several different directions at the same time and I think Olmert is clearly having a rough time. The question is will this force him to step down," Brown said. The Maariv poll showed that if elections were held today, Olmert's Kadima party would win just 14 seats in parliament, compared with the 29 it won at the last polls. Likud would win 24, compared with 12. The left-leaning Labour party would win just nine seats. In addition to calling for Olmert's resignation, 74 percent of Israelis in the Yedioth poll said Defense Minister Amir Peretz, the left-leaning Labour party leader, should step down.
- Mark Regev reiterated Israel would not lift its air and sea embargo of Lebanon until peacekeepers take positions along the Syrian border to block arms shipments to Hezbollah from its two main supporters, Iran and Syria. But Annan said peacekeepers would deploy on the Syrian border only at Lebanon's request, which Beirut has yet to make. Such a move would aggravate tensions with Syria, which views the deployment of international troops along the border as a hostile act. "The resolution does not require the deployment of U.N. troops to the border," Annan said at a news conference after a three-hour meeting with the 25 EU ministers. Regev, however, argued that sending troops to Syrian border is key to enforcing an international arms embargo against Hezbollah imposed under the cease-fire resolution. "The cease-fire calls for an international arms embargo against Hezbollah," Regev said. "So Israel will be willing to allow for unfettered access in and out of Lebanon the minute those international and Lebanese forces are enforcing the arms embargo." The issue is unlikely to prevent the Israeli government, which is under domestic pressure to pull out of Lebanon quickly, from withdrawing its soldiers. However, Israel could use airstrikes on border crossings, roads and bridges to prevent arms smuggling if Lebanese troops and the U.N. force did not stop shipments themselves.

== 26 August ==
Israel
- Israel said it was encouraging some Muslim countries to send peacekeepers to southern Lebanon, a contribution that would lend credibility to the heavily European force. The EU and U.N. agree the peacekeeping mission must have a strong Muslim component to give it credibility. Israel, however, objects to nations that do not recognize the Jewish state, saying such troops would make it impossible for Jerusalem to share intelligence with the U.N. force. But Israel said it has been in touch with other Muslim countries to encourage them to participate, particularly Turkey, which has diplomatic relations with Israel. "If Turkey decides to send a contingent, we would welcome that," said Israeli Foreign Ministry spokesman Mark Regev. Jordan and Egypt also are among Muslim countries that have diplomatic relations with Israel. The international force is to reinforce the Lebanese army, which is moving 15,000 soldiers of its own into the south. They are the first assertion of central authority in the region along the Israeli border in decades. The debate over policing the Syrian border is unlikely to delay Israel's withdrawal of troops from Lebanon. After what many consider a mismanaged war, the Israeli public is pressuring the government to get the army out quickly.
Hezbollah
- The difficulties facing the nascent force were already apparent, with a top Hezbollah official saying in a defiant interview published that the Shiite Muslim guerrilla group would keep its weapons despite international pressure to disarm. Sheik Naim Qassem, the group's deputy leader, also told the Lebanese newspaper An-Nahar that Hezbollah's "resistance" to Israel would continue. "Justifications for ending it do not exist," he said. Qassem's remarks underscored the fragility of the U.N.-brokered cease-fire.
Lebanon
- Five Lebanese, included four children from the same family, were wounded by cluster bombs left over from the Israeli offensive. They exploded in two southern Lebanese villages, Lebanese security officials said. One cluster bomb exploded outside a home in the village of Blida, wounding four children from the same family, the officials said. It was not clear whether the children, whose ages were not immediately known, were playing with the bomb or had stepped on it by accident. Separately, a Lebanese shepherd was wounded when another cluster bomb exploded in the border village of Aitaroun, less than three miles south of Blida. Since a U.N.-brokered cease-fire took hold 14 August, eight Lebanese have been killed by exploding ordnance, including two children, and 38 people have been wounded. Lebanese Prime Minister Fouad Seniora's office released a statement saying Secretary of State Condoleezza Rice called the premier and said she was exerting "serious and prompt" efforts to get the Israeli blockade lifted as soon as possible. Rice also stressed the importance of Lebanese authorities controlling the country's border crossings, and Seniora said his government was going ahead with its plan to police the crossings on its own, the statement said. There was no immediate comment from the State Department. Earlier in the day, Lebanese Information Minister Ghazi al-Aridi criticized the United States over the blockade. "We regret to say that the U.S. administration stands by Israel on this, and we absolutely condemn and reject this position," he told reporters in Beirut. He urged the international community to help get the blockade lifted "because we in Lebanon cannot endure more humiliation." While aimed at Hezbollah arms shipments, the blockade also is hindering shipments of food, fuel and other goods to Lebanon.
Syria
- Syria and Iran deny helping Hezbollah. But Syria's state news agency said Iranian Deputy Foreign Minister Mahammad Rida Baqeri was in Damascus to discuss the "repercussions of the latest Israeli aggression in Lebanon."

== 27 August ==
Israel
- Combat soldiers say they were given conflicting orders, with no clear direction. Reservists say they suffered from serious shortages of equipment and indecisive leadership. The families of the 120 soldiers killed in the fighting wonder what their loved ones died for, especially the one-fifth of them who died in the two days after the cease-fire was agreed to, but before it was implemented on 14 August. One of those killed on the final weekend was Uri Grossman, the 20-year-old son of celebrated Israeli author David Grossman, who had held a news conference three days earlier calling for an end to the fighting. "We as a family have already lost the war," Grossman told mourners at his son's funeral. And on the home front, more than 1 million residents of northern Israel are demanding to know why they had to flee their homes or hide underground in unsanitary bomb shelters as Hezbollah rockets rained down on them for more than a month, and why the government failed to provide enough food, water or financial compensation for their suffering. "No leadership has ever before come out of a war so battered and shamed," said Yossi Sarid, a former leader of the left-wing Meretz Party who as a young man served as a political aide to the disgraced generation of 1973."There's nothing for it but to get rid of them," he said. For many Israelis, the arrogance and failure of Ehud Olmert and Dan Halutz and their refusal to resign are symptomatic of a country that has lost its sense of spiritual heart and historical mission, replacing them with the mindless pursuit of money, sex and power. Gideon Samet from the Haaretz said Israel has become "a country of proliferating poverty, arrogant millionaires, insensitive bank executives with fat salaries, Third World infrastructure, crumbling city centers, a miserable Knesset and broken promises. Only a war could have brought the revulsion to the surface."
- Israel and Hezbollah may exchange prisoners within the next two or three weeks, reports from the Middle East say. The Jerusalem Post, quoting the Egyptian newspaper Al-Ahram, said the exchange would begin with the release of two Israeli soldiers whose kidnappings sparked the monthlong conflict between Israel and Hezbollah. The Israeli soldier held by Palestinians in Gaza would also be released, the report said, followed by Israel's release of Palestinian prisoners. Haaretz confirmed that information, and also said German negotiators are working toward a deal.
- The Egyptian state-run daily Al-Ahram says that Israel and Hezbollah have agreed to terms on a prisoner exchange for the release of the two abducted soldiers, Israel Radio reported.
Hezbollah
- Meanwhile, Hezbollah's leader said Italy may join negotiations already brokered by Germany that could lead to an exchange next month. In an interview with Lebanon's New TV, Sheik Hassan Nasrallah said the United Nations—which initiated the cease-fire—supported Italy's involvement, which could begin as early as this week. Germany would give Hezbollah a "100 percent guarantee" the prisoners held in Israel would be released as promised, Al-Ahram said. Germany successfully arranged an Israeli-Hezbollah prisoner swap in 2004.
- Hezbollah would not have abducted two Israel Defense Forces soldiers on 12 July had it known that the action would lead to war in Lebanon, the leader of the militant group, Sheikh Hassan Nasrallah, said in an interview televised. Hezbollah is demanding the release of some of the thousands of Arabs in Israeli prisons in exchange for the kidnapped soldiers Ehud Goldwasser and Eldad Regev. "We did not think, even one percent, that the capture would lead to a war at this time and of this magnitude. You ask me, if I had known on 11 July... that the operation would lead to such a war, would I do it? I say no, absolutely not," he said in an interview with Lebanon's New TV station. Nasrallah also said he did not believe there would be a second round of fighting with Israel, and that Hezbollah would adhere to the cease-fire despite what he called Israeli provocation. Nasrallah said that Israel was trying to press new demands such as the deployment of United Nations peacekeeping forces at Beirut airport, at Lebanese ports and on Lebanon's border with Syria. But, he added: "Their displaced people are going back and they have started to rebuild the north. Someone who acts like that doesn't seem to be going to war. We are not heading to a second round." The Hezbollah leader also said that negotiations on the release of the abducted IDF soldiers have already begun. "Contacts recently began for negotiations," Hezbollah said. "It seems that Italy is trying to get into the subject. The United Nations is interested and the negotiations would be through Parliamentary Speaker Nabih Berri."
- "We have no problem with UNIFIL (UN Interim Force in Lebanon) as long as its mission is not aimed at disarming Hezbollah," Nasrallah said in his second interview since the UN-brokered ceasefire on 14 August. Nasrallah said that there "will be no armed presence in southern Lebanon, and if the army finds any armed Hezbollah they can confiscate the weapons." He expressed readiness to meet with Annan on 28 August. "I have no problems to meet him, and there are preparatory contacts to prepare for such a meeting, but the only obstacle is security," Nasrallah said. Asked if any of the Hezbollah guerrillas who participated in the seizure of the two Israeli soldiers on the board had been captured by Israeli troops in southern Lebanon, Nasrallah said: "The guerrillas who participated in snatching the two soldiers were all fighting on the front lines in southern Lebanon, and it may be possible that one of them was captured by the Israelis." Nasrallah said he would no longer participate "in the national dialogue round table" between Lebanese Muslim and Christians leaders, which started in March 2006, as he feared for the safety of other participants. Israel has threatened to hunt down and kill Nasrallah. "Israel is trying by their daily violations to push Hezbollah to retaliate. ... We cannot be patient for so long, and I cannot give guarantees," Nasrallah said. Nasrallah assured the Lebanese that there will not be a second round of violence with Israel. "The refugees have returned, and we have started a widescale reconstruction operation, and such hints means that we are not heading towards a second round," Nasrallah said. Asked about the disputed Shebaa Farms territory, Nasrallah said: "As I said, if there is a Lebanese territory under occupation, it is the duty of the resistance to fight the occupation," he said without elaborating. Israel says it seized the Shebaa Farms from Syria in the 1967 Middle East war, but Lebanon claims Shebaa as Lebanese territory with Syrian consent. Asked about his movement's rocket force, he said that more than 4,000 rockets fell on Israel, describing the bombardment as "less than 50 per cent of our military force."
United Nations
- UNIFIL (UN Interim Force in Lebanon), the neutral force that has been stationed there since 1978, is tasked with maintaining peace between Israel and Hizbullah along the 70-mile Israeli-Lebanese border. However, as columnist and ZOA Philadelphia chapter President Lori Lowenthal Marcus writes in the Weekly Standard this week, it appears that UNIFIL took a clearly one-sided stand in favor of Hizbullah during the recent war in Lebanon. UNIFIL "openly published daily real-time intelligence, of obvious usefulness to Hizbullah, on the location, equipment, and force structure of Israeli troops in Lebanon," Marcus wrote, "even specifying the placement of IDF safety structures within hours of their construction." In contrast, nothing specific regarding Hezbollah's terrorist forces was ever posted. Instead, only general statements such as one to the effect that Hizbullah "fired rockets in large numbers from various locations" were published. As an example, UNIFIL posted the following on 25 July: "Yesterday and during last night, the IDF moved significant reinforcements, including a number of tanks, armored personnel carriers, bulldozers and infantry, to the area of Maroun al-Ras inside Lebanese territory. The IDF advanced from that area north toward Bint Jbeil, and south towards Yarun." UNIFIL has been implicated before in partiality towards Hizbullah. Just 18 hours after the kidnapping of three IDF soldiers along the Israeli-Lebanese border in late 2000, UNIFIL troops videoed two cars that were used in the abduction and that were filled with blood and other kidnapping-related evidence. Though the videos may have helped save one or more of the soldiers' lives, high-ranking U.N. officials, including Secretary General Kofi Annan and Middle East envoy Terje Larsen, denied that any such videotape existed. Only on 6 July 2001 did the U.N. finally admit that it possessed the tape.
- The UN Security Council resolution which led to a truce on 14 August suggests in its preamble that the two sides are to find a solution to their disputes over prisoners.
Syria
- Syria backs efforts to free the abducted IDF soldiers and Arab prisoners held by Israel, U.S. civil rights leader Jesse Jackson said after meeting Syrian President Bashar al-Assad."President Assad supports the finding of their status and release. He uses influence and appeal to find out what their status is and ultimately their release," Jackson told a news conference held at the foreign ministry in Damascus. Syrian Deputy Foreign Minister Fayssal Mekdad said: "We look kindly toward Reverend Jackson's mission and encourage it. He is someone who is concerned about the human dimension of crisis." Jackson is heading a group of Muslim, Christian and Jewish leaders on a humanitarian mission to the Middle East aimed at shoring up a cease-fire in Lebanon. He will visit Lebanon and Israel next. Jackson used his clout as a non-establishment politician to negotiate the release of several U.S. prisoners abroad in the 1980s and 1990s. He secured the freedom of an American Navy pilot held by Syria in 1983 after meeting with the late Syrian president Hafez al-Assad, father of the current president, in Damascus. Jackson said Syria could play a substantial role in solving the present prisoners impasse.

== 28 August ==
Hezbollah
- According to U.S. News & World Report of 31 July 2006, Syrian and Iranian resources together include 836,000 active military personnel; 6,213 main battle tanks; and 683 attack aircraft. Compare those numbers, respectively, to those of Israel: 168,000; 3,090; and 399. Syria and Iran, besides having a combined population 23 times that of Israel, have almost five times the active troop strength, more than twice as many main battle tanks, and 284 more attack aircraft than Israel. Indeed, Syria, alone, has more than Israel in each of these categories, sources claim.
- For its part, according to the International Institute for Strategic Studies, Hezbollah at the beginning of the conflict had up to 5,000 fighters; 10,000 to 15,000 rockets (of which it used about 4,000), and 30 missiles. The Lebanese government had 72,100 active troops (though some source claim these were not used for much more than police duties), 310 tanks, and 24 helicopters. None of Lebanon's armed forces were used either to control Hezbollah, despite the fact that it is also a political party represented in the Lebanese government and therefore subject to both national and international law, or to defend its own nation in the fighting, sources say. Instead, it is claimed the Lebanese government watched the military buildup in southern Lebanon for six years after Israel pulled out for good in 2000. The Syrian Army left Lebanon only last year and so some claim that Lebanon's government "sat on its hands" and "became a laughingstock to the world while Lebanese people suffered and died." Some sources even go as far as to claim that Muslims from three countries knowingly treated other Muslims as "cannon fodder".
United States
- US civil rights leader Jesse Jackson, on a visit to the region to try to mediate a prisoner exchange, told Israeli Army Radio he had been informed by a Hezbollah leader that the two soldiers seized by the guerrilla group were alive. He said that during a visit to Damascus, "a Hamas leader told me ... that the Israeli soldier captured by Hamas is alive". Palestinian militants abducted Corporal Gilad Shalit in a cross-border raid from Gaza in June 2006.

== 29 August ==
Israel
- Israeli Defence Minister Amir Peretz said Israel would pull out thousands of troops that remain in southern Lebanon once a "reasonable" number of UN soldiers had deployed but did not give a figure. Resolution 1701 calls for a deployment of 15,000 UN peacekeepers by 4 November 2006, alongside Lebanese army troops.
United Nations
- Annan said the Lebanese saw the blockade as a "humiliation and infringement of their sovereignty". But he also urged Beirut to exert control over its borders to stop arms smuggling. On a visit to devastated southern Lebanon, Annan said "serious irritants" to the truce were also the fate of the abducted soldiers and that of Lebanese prisoners held in Israel.
Italy
- Italy's first contingent of 800 troops, out of an eventual 3000 pledged, set sail on what Rome said would be a "long and risky" mission. The aircraft carrier Garibaldi and four other naval ships were due to reach Lebanon by 1 September 2006.
France
- France promised to send a 900-strong battalion before the middle of September 2006, with a second battalion to follow.

== 30 August ==
Israel
- Israel rejected a call from UN Secretary-General Kofi Annan to lift its six-week air-and-sea blockade of Lebanon, saying it would only raise the siege once all elements of a ceasefire were in place. During an hour of talks with Prime Minister Ehud Olmert, Annan had pressed for a lifting of the blockade mainly on economic grounds. But at a news conference after their meeting, Olmert rebuffed Annan, saying any relaxation of pressure on Lebanon's ports and airspace depended on the full implementation of UN resolution 1701, which governs the ceasefire with Hezbollah. "The (resolution) is a fixed buffet and everything will be implemented, including the lifting of the blockade, as part of the entire implementation of the different articles," he said. Olmert was equally firm when it came to suggestions from Annan that Israel should withdraw all its troops from southern Lebanon within "days or weeks", once up to 5000 UN-backed peacekeepers are on the ground. "Israel will pull out of Lebanon once the resolution is implemented," Olmert said, indicating a longer timeline. The truce on Israel's northern border is generally holding, but violence has continued in the Palestinian territories. Israel says the sea and air embargo is designed to prevent Hezbollah from getting new arms supplies from Iran or Syria. Picking up a proposal Annan made in Beirut, a senior Israeli political source said Israel would discuss freeing Lebanese prisoners for two soldiers captured by Hizbollah, if the two were handed over to the Beirut government. Israel has previously insisted on their unconditional release.
United Nations
- Annan, in Jerusalem after visiting Lebanon, is trying to strengthen a shaky, two-week-old truce that ended a 34-day war between Israel and Hizbollah. His top priority had been the lifting of the blockade, principally on economic grounds. "It is important not only because of the economic effect it is having on the country but it is also important to strengthen the democratic government of Lebanon with which Israel has repeatedly said it had no problems," Annan said. Annan said he hoped soon to double to 5000 the number of UN troops in Lebanon and urged Israel and Hizbollah to end swiftly all disputes blocking a lasting ceasefire. Annan will also hold talks with Foreign Minister Tzipi Livni before traveling to the West Bank to meet Palestinian President Mahmoud Abbas. Aides to Annan have said he will also travel to Syria and Iran, Hezbollah's main backers, later in the week.
Lebanon
- The war cost the lives of nearly 1200 people in Lebanon, mostly civilians, and 157 Israelis, mostly soldiers.

== 31 August ==
United Nations
- UN Secretary-General Kofi Annan began talks with Syrian officials to seek Syria's help in bolstering a truce between Israel and Lebanon's Hezbollah. Before arriving in the Syrian capital Damascus, Annan renewed from Jordan his calls for Israel to lift its blockade of Lebanon swiftly and to withdraw fully from the country as soon as 5,000 UN peacekeepers are in the south. "I expect – and I did make this clear to the Israeli authorities – that when the international forces have reached 5,000 and are deployed to the south with the Lebanese (army), it is time for them to withdraw and withdraw completely," Annan told a news conference after talks with Jordan's King Abdullah. He said in a radio interview he hoped the UN peacekeepers would be in place until 7 September or 10 September 2006. Annan met with Syrian Foreign Minister Walid al-Moualem in Damascus later in the day. He is expected to hold talks with President Bashar al-Assad on 1 September 2006. Annan described Israel's 7-week-old blockade of Lebanon as "unsustainable", saying: "It is important that it is lifted and not be seen as collective punishment of the Lebanese people." Annan said he hoped to double very quickly the 2,500 UN peacekeepers already in south Lebanon, where the first big contingent of 800 Italian troops is due on 2 September 2006 and 3 September 2006. The UN resolution envisages sending a force of up to 15,000 to south Lebanon by 4 November 2006 to help a similar number of Lebanese troops police a weapons-free border zone.
Syria
- Syrian leaders have been angered by an Israeli demand for international troops to deploy on the Lebanese-Syrian border to stop arms smuggling to Hezbollah.
Lebanon
- Lebanon, which has sent 8,600 soldiers to patrol the border, says it has no plans to ask UN troops to join them. International donors pledged more than $US940 million (A$1.2 billion) for near-term relief efforts for Lebanon, nearly double the target. "An amount exceeding $940 million has been pledged," Swedish Foreign Minister Jan Eliasson told the conference. The Swedish government, which hosted the meeting, had set a target of $US500 million (A$656 million) in pledges for Lebanon, which has said it suffered billions of dollars of damages. "Lebanon, which only seven weeks ago was full of hope and promise, has been torn to shreds by destruction, displacement, dispossession, desolation, and death," Lebanese Prime Minister Fouad Siniora had told the conference. Lebanese troops, accompanied by UN peacekeepers, took up posts on the border with Israel for the first time in decades.
Italy
- Italian Prime Minister Romano Prodi, whose nation is set to be UNIFIL's biggest contributor, said Israeli Deputy Prime Minister Shimon Peres had told him that Israel would begin pulling out its troops once 5,000 UN troops were in place. But Peres spokesman Yoram Dori, commenting on Prodi's remark, said: "Israeli troops will withdraw if the UN troops deploy in every place that ensures the implementation of Security Council Resolution 1701."
IDF
- Israeli troops have been gradually withdrawing for the past two weeks and the army said it held less than a third of the land it occupied during the war. "The rest of the territory was handed over to UNIFIL and the Lebanese army," a spokesman said.
Palestinian territories
- There has been no let up in violence in the Palestinian territories, largely overshadowed by the crisis in Lebanon. In the West Bank, Israeli troops killed a militant commander, while Palestinian gunmen in the Gaza Strip renewed rocket strikes they had mostly suspended during the Lebanon war.
Israel
- They came in their thousands, on a muggy evening, to ask a simple question: "What's become of our missing boys?" – the three Israeli soldiers, whose abductions triggered the parallel crises in Gaza and Lebanon. Their families, friends and supporters, gathered in Rabin Square – traditional home to Israeli demonstrations – to demand their return, with the country weary and frustrated by this latest, inconclusive, upheaval. Night fell and over in Rabin Square, the demonstrators, 40,000 strong, urged the country not to forget its missing soldiers. Two very different statements, but each rooted in the human cost of Israel's unresolved relations with its Arab neighbours.
