= Cosmetic industry =

Industry that manufactures and distributes cosmetic products

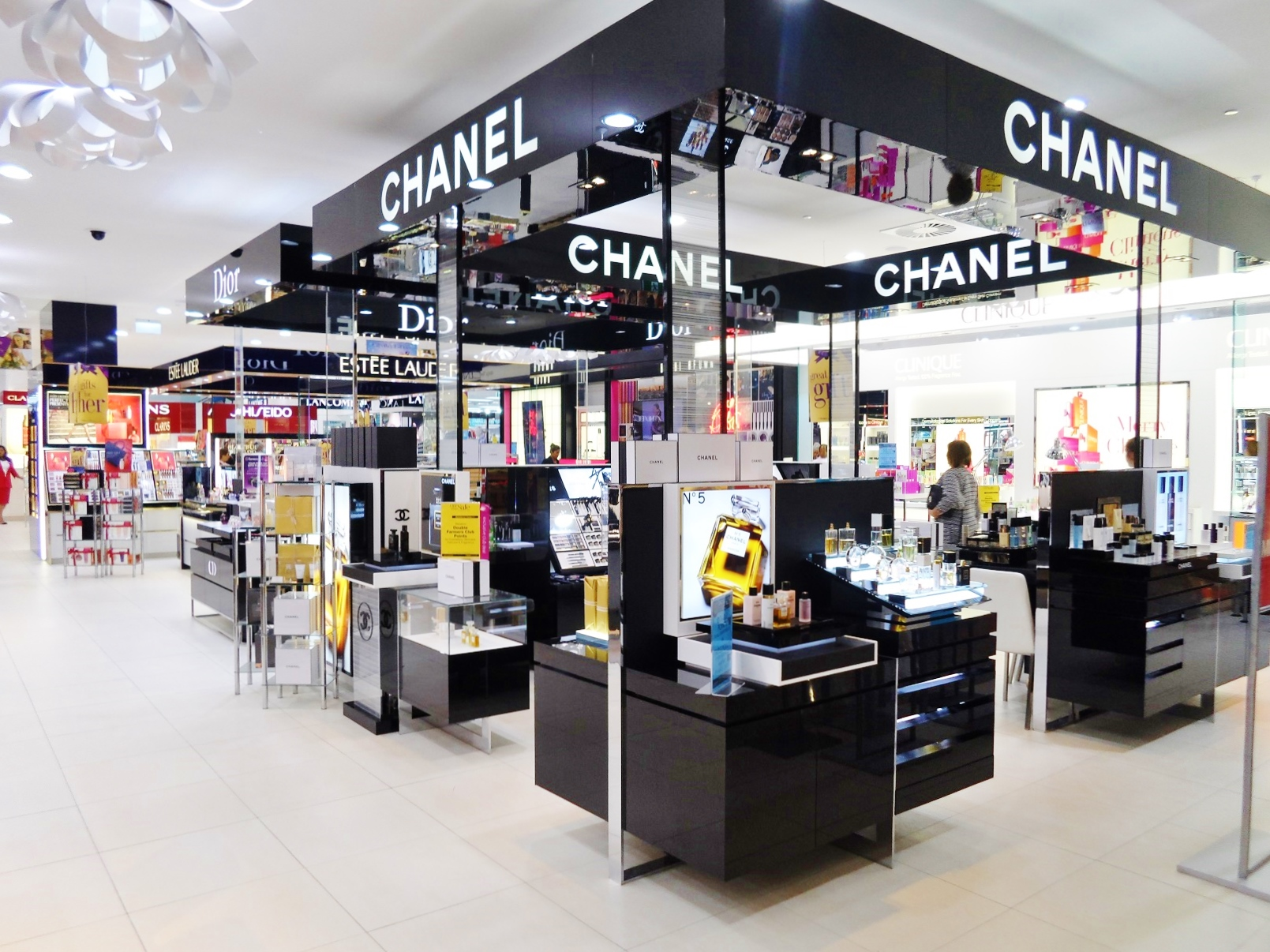
Cosmetics at department store Farmers Centre Place in Hamilton, New Zealand

The cosmetic industry describes the industry that manufactures and distributes cosmetic products. These include colour cosmetics, like foundation and mascara, skincare such as moisturisers and cleansers, haircare such as shampoos, conditioners and hair colours, and toiletries such as bubble bath and soap. The manufacturing segment of the industry is dominated by a small number of multinational corporations that originated in the early 20th century, but the distribution and sale of cosmetics is spread among a wide range of different businesses. Cosmetics must be safe when customers use them in accordance with the label's instructions or in the conventional or expected manner. One measure a producer may take to guarantee the safety of a cosmetic product is product testing. FDA occasionally does testing as part of its research program or when looking into potential safety issues with a product. Both the cosmetics business and consumers can benefit from the FDA's resources on product testing.

The largest cosmetic companies are L'Oreal, Estée Lauder, Coty, Nivea, Shiseido and Chanel. The market volume of the cosmetics industry in Europe and the United States is about EUR €70 billion per year, according to a 2005 publication. The worldwide cosmetics and perfume industry currently generates an estimated annual turnover of US$170 billion (according to Eurostaf – May 2007). Europe is the leading market, representing approximately €63 billion.

== By region ==
=== Americas ===
==== United States ====
Within the United States, the state of California has the largest concentration of beauty establishments in America at 25.5%, followed by New Jersey at 8.1% of American beauty establishments. Since 2016, the number of cosmetic stores rises between 3 and 4% each year and employment in this division is rising each year 13-16%.

California has the largest concentration due to social media marketing from celebrities and 'beauty gurus'. For example, Kylie Jenner's company Kylie Cosmetics, is valued at $800 million and sold an estimated $330 million worth of makeup in 2017. YouTube and social media influencers Jeffree Star (Jeffree Star Cosmetics), and Michelle Phan (Ipsy), and pop-star Rihanna with her Fenty Beauty line of cosmetics, have also contributed to California's rising popularity in the beauty industry.

Because the US dollar is so valuable to other countries around the world, it has become extremely expensive for most countries to import American beauty products and to export their own products to America. However, there are a few countries with beauty products that are in popular demand in America due to their quality and value including France, Canada, Italy, and the United Kingdom.

As of 2018, "These four countries account for 45.2% of all industry imports as domestic consumers demand luxury products". South Korean and Japanese skincare products which are designed to be more gentle and innovative, are also becoming more popularized in the United States due to their quality and affordability. The U.S. has held the same regulation over this industry since 1938 under the FD&C Act, which has gained additional amendments over time.

==== Canada ====
Canada is a big influencer in the American beauty industry due to its proximity to the United States and because it falls under the North American Free Trade Agreement (NAFTA). This agreement "eliminates most tariffs on products traded between Canada, Mexico, and the United States," and allows Canada to trade superfluously. Canada accounts for an estimated 13.6% of imports and 19.9% of cosmetic exports in 2018. Because Mexico also benefits from the NAFTA trade agreement, they represent another top cosmetic importer and exporter for lower-priced beauty products which are manufactured in mass and sold in large drug store chains in America.

=== Europe ===
==== France ====
Cosmetic sales in France reached €6.5 billion in 2006, according to FIPAR (Fédération des Industries de la Parfumerie – the French federation for the perfume industry). France is another country in which the cosmetic industry plays an important role, both nationally and internationally. Most products with a label, "Made in France" are valued on the international market. According to data from 2008, the cosmetic industry has grown constantly in France for 40 consecutive years. Famous cosmetic brands produced in France include Vichy, Yves Saint Laurent, Yves Rocher, Bioderma and L'Oreal. L'Oreal is known for its mass production of hair and makeup products which are produced in mass and sold in drug stores in America as well as internationally. L'Oreal has gained popularity especially due to its app Makeup Genius which allows users to try on makeup using their phone camera in addition to working with Los Angeles-based NYX Cosmetics and Estee Lauder's MAC Cosmetics, L'Oreal is one of the leading cosmetic brands in the United States. According to the company's latest financial report of 2017, North America accounted for 13.6% of the company's global cosmetic sales.

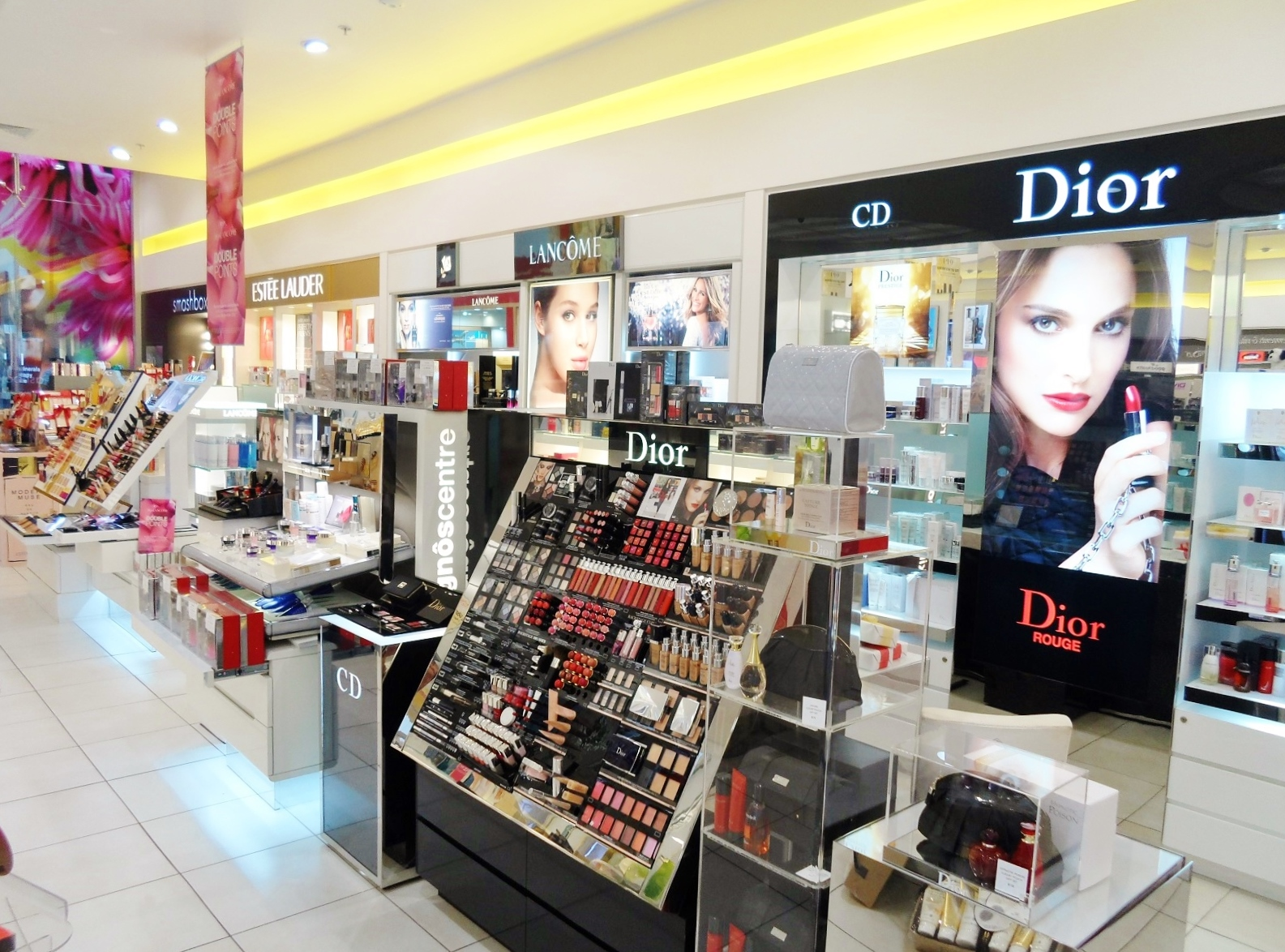
Cosmetics at Life Pharmacy at Westfield Albany on the North Shore of Auckland, New Zealand

==== Germany ====
In Germany, the cosmetic industry generated €12.6 billion of retail sales in 2008, which, at the time, made the German cosmetic industry the third largest in the world after Japan and the United States. It has been shown that Germany's cosmetic industry grew nearly 5 percent in one year, from 2007 to 2008. German exports in this industry reached €5.8 billion in 2008, whereas imports of cosmetics totaled €3 billion. Germany gains most of its imported cosmetics from France, Switzerland, the United States and Italy.

==== Italy ====
In Italy, the cosmetics industry makes a significant contribution in the national economy, known by its commitment to innovation, quality, and the status enjoyed by the "Made in Italy" label. According to a 2022 Cosmetics Europe study, Italy ranks third among national markets for cosmetics, with a market value of €11.5 billion, trailing only behind Germany and France. The sector's value was reported at $17.5 billion in 2017.

The cosmetic sector demonstrates steady growth, exhibited by brands like Gucci Beauty, Armani Beauty, Dolce&Gabbana Beauty, among others. For instance, in a September 2021 sales report, Gucci's perfumes and makeup were significant contributors to Coty's Prestige Division, which reported revenues of $870.7 million. Additionally, in 2022, Dolce&Gabbana Beauty established itself as a standalone entity with a valuation of €1 billion, as it became the first Italian company to take direct control over its beauty operations, from production through to sales and marketing. Furthermore, Italian brands Armani and Valentino have been instrumental in increasing the sales of the L'Oreal luxury division, their French licensee, in 2022.

==== Belarus ====
The Belarusian cosmetics market consists of Belarusian companies. There are more than 20 cosmetic companies in Belarus - Belita, Vitex, Lux Visage, Mastige, Modum, Rekish Cosmetics. The volume of the cosmetic market is more than 300 million euros per year.

=== Asia ===
The cosmetic industry in Asia is mainly dominated by regional cosmetic brands. Shiseido Co. Ltd, a popular cosmetic brand based in Japan, has 82.1% of its sales in Asia. No other Western company in the top 10 match these kinds of regional sales. Furthermore, geographic dispersion of sales by Asian cosmetic companies in Asia accounted for 92.42% of sales, while geographic dispersion of assets of Asian cosmetic companies in Asia was 87.05%. Western cosmetic companies often have failed to gain footholds in various countries. For example, in Japan, many advertisement campaigns that find success in the West, such as celebrity appearances and references to science, did not sway a sample group of respondents to purchase the foreign brands. However, despite the lack of Western cosmetic presence, the growing trend of "fair skin", or whiting one's skin, can expose consumers skin to harmful chemicals when using "fairness creams".

While there has been significant economic growth in many Asian markets, regulation pertaining to chemicals in cosmetic products has been concurrently lacking. SK-II, a cosmetic product owned by P&G, was found to contain banned heavy metals in China in 2006. Another study found that women who had recently moved to Vancouver, Canada from East and South Asia had higher levels of lead in their blood than South and East Asian immigrants who had been living in Canada for longer. One of sources of lead was determined to be some facial powders marketed in various regions of Asia.

=== Indonesia ===
Indonesia is one of the fastest-growing cosmetics markets in Southeast Asia, fueled by rising middle-class income and demand for halal and vegan-certified beauty products. In 2019, the Indonesian government began enforcing mandatory halal certification for cosmetics, overseen by the Indonesian Ulema Council (MUI) and the Food and Drug Authority (BPOM).

The Indonesian cosmetics sector is composed of established consumer brands such as Wardah, Sariayu, and Martha Tilaar, as well as private label OEM/ODM manufacturers like Formula Jelita International, which produce halal-certified and vegan cosmetic products for local and international markets.

According to Euromonitor, Indonesia's cosmetics market has grown rapidly, with a market size estimated at over US$7 billion in 2022, driven by online retail and increasing consumer awareness of product safety and ethical sourcing.

== Fashion designer collaboration ==
Due to the popularity of cosmetics, especially fragrances and perfumes, many designers who are not necessarily involved in the cosmetic industry came up with different perfumes carrying their names. Moreover, some actors and singers have their own perfume line (such as Celine Dion). Designer perfumes are, like any other designer products, the most expensive in the industry as the consumer pays not only for the product but also for the brand.

== Marketing ==
The cosmetic industry sells their cosmetic products online, even in countries in which they do not have representatives.

Research on the email marketing of cosmetics to consumers suggests they are goal-oriented with email content that is seen as useful, motivating recipients to visit a store to test the cosmetics or talk to sales representatives. Useful content included special sales offerings and new product information rather than information about makeup trends.

== Controversies ==
=== Colorism ===
Many companies advertise white or light skin as not only a cosmetic change, but a lifestyle change. White beauty implies a lifestyle of "sophistication, beauty, power, and wealth." Mass advertising and marketing from the US and Europe, as well as multiple mass media forms are used to reach other cultures to influence their purchasing habits. Many of the skin lightening products sold usually have celebrity endorsements, further increasing sales and the desire for lighter skin. These products can cause serious damage to skin and pose a health risk to the consumer. Not only do these products cause harmful health/skin conditions but it equates beauty with whiteness, which ultimately reinforces white supremacy and hetero-patriarchal beauty standards.

In a study done by S. S. Agrawal and Pallavi Sharma on eleven skin lightening products sold in India, it was found that "mercury was detected in all the samples of the skin lightening creams in the range of 0.14–0.36 ppm." This study also observed that none of the brands tested include mercury as an ingredient on the packaging, which may mislead consumers regarding health risks. In a report by the World Health Organization, it was stated that "skin whitening products can cause leukemia, liver and kidney cancer and could also result in severe skin conditions." Though these health risks exist, women of color in many parts of the world are purchasing skin lightening creams.

Choma and Prusaczyk's survey of women of color in the US and India "show[s] that chronic surveillance of skin tone predicts skin tone dissatisfaction and skin bleaching." Some companies in the cosmetic industry have capitalized off of the cultural pressure and standards for having lighter skin. This study concluded that "skin bleaching is not merely a physical or aesthetic change, but one with potentially wide-ranging implications on psychological well-being and, more broadly, the perpetuation of racist ideologies and beauty standards."

=== Impact on environment ===
Some components found in cosmetics, as well as their production, have been found to have negative environmental impact. For example, Palm oil is found in lipstick, and shampoo. Palm oil is connected to the destruction of forests and habitats of endangered species, including orangutans, tigers, elephants, and rhinos.

=== Animal testing ===
Animal testing has been a large controversy in the cosmetic industry. Animal tests performed include the Draize eye irritancy test, where test chemicals are applied to rabbits' eyes and left on for several days, and toxicity tests such as LD_{50}, where a substance's toxicity is tested by determining the concentration at which it will kill 50% of the test animals.

Due to public outcry as well as financial and temporal considerations, animal testing in cosmetics has steadily been decreasing over time and replaced with non-animal tests. One of these non-animal tests is the Environmental Protection Agency's ToxCast which has a similar accuracy compared to animal tests but achieves results with fewer economic costs and less time.

An EU ban of marketing cosmetic products which have been tested on animals became effective in 2013. There are a few exceptions to this law. Animal testing data for cosmetics can be used if the data for the ingredient used in the cosmetic originated from testing for non-cosmetic products. Secondly, if a country outside of the EU requires animal testing and the cosmetic product was tested in that country, the ban also does not apply. Cosmetic tests on animals are still legal in several countries, such as the US, Japan, Russia, and China.

There are a number of cosmetics companies that claim they are "cruelty-free," such as Bath & Body Works, Aveda, ELF, and Milani, but some argue that because the label of "cruelty-free" both lacks regulation and standardized third-party certification, it has little real weight. Brands that claim to be cruelty free often advertise this with a logo of a rabbit on their products.

In some cases, cosmetic testing is done on humans, which also leads to a related discussion of best practices and ethics.

== Labor rights and body politics ==
A number of studies have focused on social issues such as labor rights and sociology of the body. Research has found that some retail stores have discriminatory hiring practices and prefer to hire class-privileged workers to promote their upscale image.

== See also ==
- Animal–industrial complex
- Beauty salon
- Beauty store
- Cosmetics policy
- Wildlife smuggling
