= Leslie P. Kaelbling =

American roboticist

- Education: Stanford University
- Known for: Partially observable Markov decision process Founder and first editor-in-chief of the Journal of Machine Learning Research
- Children: 2
- Awards: IJCAI Computers and Thought Award (1997); AAAI Fellow (2000)
- Scientific career
- Fields: Robotics; Computer Science
- Workplaces: SRI International; Brown University; Massachusetts Institute of Technology
- Thesis: Learning in Embedded Systems (1990)
- Doctoral advisor: Nils J. Nilsson
- Doctoral students: Michael L. Littman; Leonid Peshkin; Kristian Kersting
- Website: people.csail.mit.edu/lpk/

Leslie Pack Kaelbling is an American roboticist and the Panasonic Professor of Computer Science and Engineering at the Massachusetts Institute of Technology. She is widely recognized for adapting partially observable Markov decision processes from operations research for application in artificial intelligence and robotics. Kaelbling received the IJCAI Computers and Thought Award in 1997 for applying reinforcement learning to embedded control systems and developing programming tools for robot navigation. In 2000, she was elected as a Fellow of the Association for the Advancement of Artificial Intelligence.

== Career ==
Kaelbling received an A. B. in Philosophy in 1983 and a Ph.D. in Computer Science in 1990, both from Stanford University. During this time she was also affiliated with the Center for the Study of Language and Information. She then worked at SRI International and the affiliated robotics spin-off Teleos Research before joining the faculty at Brown University. She left Brown in 1999 to join the faculty at MIT. Her research focuses on decision-making under uncertainty, machine learning, and sensing with applications to robotics.

== Journal of Machine Learning Research ==
In the spring of 2000, she and two-thirds of the editorial board of the Kluwer-owned journal Machine Learning resigned in protest to its pay-to-access archives with simultaneously limited financial compensation for authors. Kaelbling co-founded and served as the first editor-in-chief of the Journal of Machine Learning Research, a peer-reviewed open access journal on the same topics which allows researchers to publish articles for free and retain copyright with its archives freely available online. In response to the mass resignation, Kluwer changed their publishing policy to allow authors to self-archive their papers online after peer-review. Kaelbling responded that this policy was reasonable and would have made the creation of an alternative journal unnecessary, but the editorial board members had made it clear they wanted such a policy and it was only after the threat of resignations and the actual founding of JMLR that the publishing policy finally changed.

== Selected works ==
- Reinforcement Learning: A Survey (LP Kaelbling, ML Littman, AW Moore). Journal of Artificial Intelligence Research (JAIR) 4 (1996) 237-285. A highly cited survey on the field of reinforcement learning.
- Planning and acting in partially observable stochastic domains (LP Kaelbling, ML Littman, AR Cassandra). Artificial Intelligence 101 (1), 99-134.
- Acting under uncertainty: Discrete Bayesian models for mobile-robot navigation (AR Cassandra, LP Kaelbling, JA Kurien). Intelligent Robots and Systems (2) 963-972.
- The synthesis of digital machines with provable epistemic properties (SJ Rosenschein, LP Kaelbling). Proceedings of the 1986 Conference on Theoretical Aspects of Reasoning about Knowledge, 83-98.
- Practical reinforcement learning in continuous spaces (WD Smart, LP Kaelbling). 2000 International Conference on Machine Learning (ICML), 903-910.
- Hierarchical task and motion planning in the now (LP Kaelbling, T Lozano-Pérez). 2011 IEEE International Conference on Robotics and Automation (ICRA), 1470-1477.
