= Yoram Moses =

Israeli academic

- יוֹרָם מוֹזֶס
- Education: Hebrew University of Jerusalem (B.Sc.), Stanford University (Ph.D.)
- Known for: Distributed systems, Reasoning about knowledge
- Notable work: Reasoning About Knowledge
- Spouse: Yael Moses
- Awards: Gödel Prize (1997), Dijkstra Prize (2009)
- Scientific career
- Fields: Computer Science, Electrical Engineering
- Workplaces: Technion – Israel Institute of Technology

Yoram Moses (Hebrew: יוֹרָם מוֹזֶס) is a Professor in the Electrical Engineering Department at the Technion - Israel Institute of Technology.

Yoram Moses received a B.Sc. in mathematics from the Hebrew University of Jerusalem in 1981, and a Ph.D. in Computer Science from Stanford University in 1986. Moses is a co-author of the book Reasoning About Knowledge, and is a winner of the 1997 Gödel Prize in theoretical computer science and the 2009 Dijkstra Prize in Distributed Computing.

His major research interests are distributed systems and reasoning about knowledge.

He is married to the computer scientist Yael Moses.
