= Michael L. Littman =

American computer scientist (born 1966)

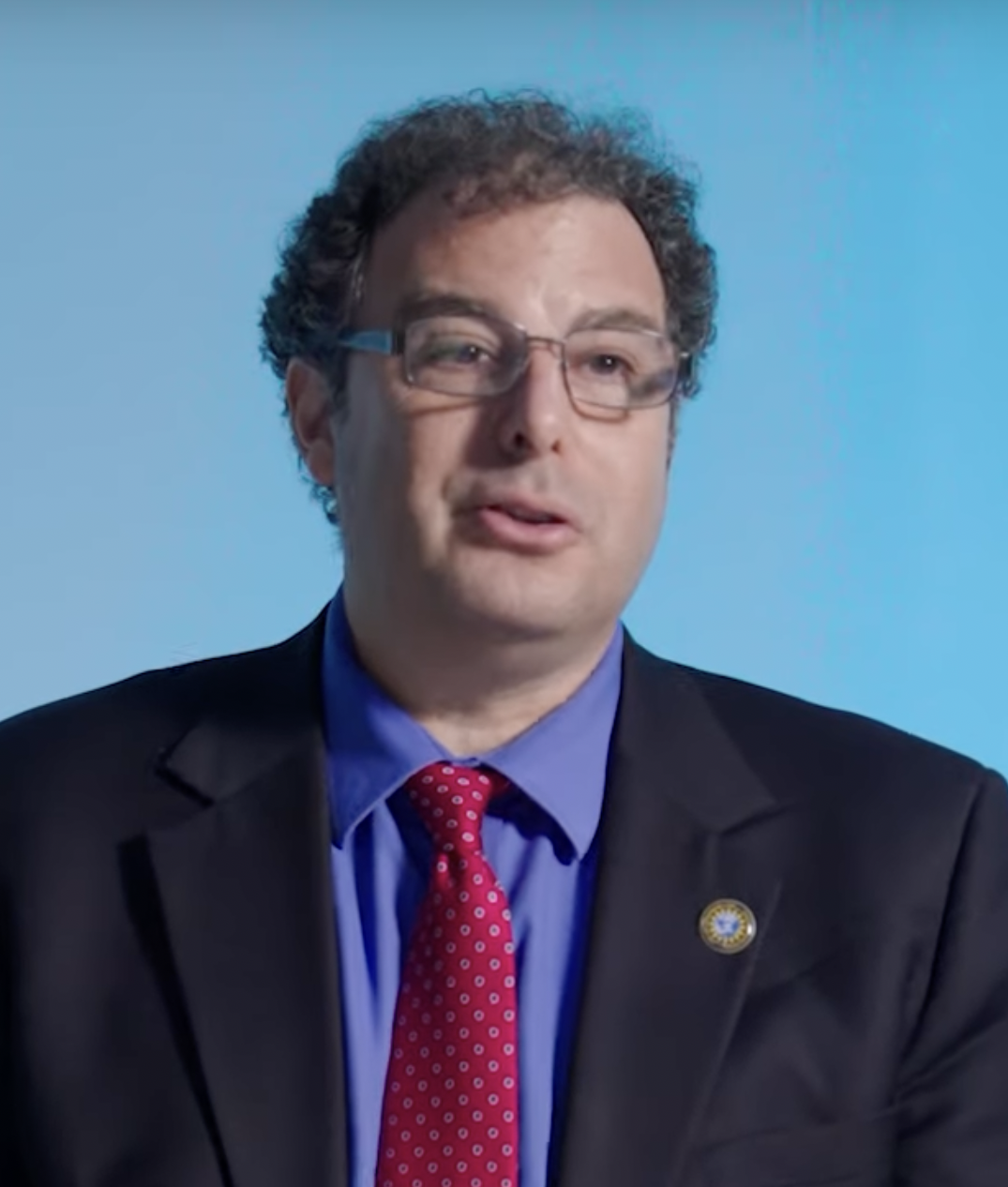
- Littman in 2023
- Born: August 30, 1966 (age 60); Philadelphia, Pennsylvania
- Education: Brown University; Yale University
- Awards: AAAI Fellow; ACM Fellow
- Scientific career
- Fields: Computer Science
- Workplaces: Brown University; Rutgers University; Georgia Institute of Technology; AT&T; Duke University; National Science Foundation
- Thesis: Algorithms for sequential decision-making (1996)
- Doctoral advisor: Leslie P. Kaelbling
- Website: cs.brown.edu/~mlittman/

Michael Lederman Littman (born August 30, 1966) is a computer scientist, researcher, educator, and author. His research interests focus on reinforcement learning. He is currently a University Professor of Computer Science at Brown University, where he has taught since 2012. As of July 2025, he is also the university’s inaugural Associate Provost for Artificial Intelligence.

== Career ==
Before graduate school, Littman worked with Thomas Landauer at Bellcore and was granted a patent for one of the earliest systems for cross-language information retrieval. Littman received his Ph.D. in computer science from Brown University in 1996. From 1996 to 1999, he was a professor at Duke University. During his time at Duke, he worked on an automated crossword solver PROVERB, which won an Outstanding Paper Award in 1999 from AAAI and competed in the American Crossword Puzzle Tournament. From 2000 to 2002, he worked at AT&T. From 2002 to 2012, he was a professor at Rutgers University; he chaired the department from 2009-12. In Summer 2012 he returned to Brown University as a full professor. He has also taught at Georgia Institute of Technology, where he was listed as an adjunct professor. Littman served as the Division Director for Information and Intelligent Systems (the AI division) at the National Science Foundation from 2022-2025. After serving a term, he returned to Brown University as their first Associate Provost for Artificial Intelligence where he coordinates the intersection of AI with research, teaching, operations, policy, and communication at the university level.

== Research ==
Littman's research interests are varied but have focused mostly on reinforcement learning and related fields, particularly, in machine learning more generally, game theory, computer networking, partially observable Markov decision process solving, computer solving of analogy problems and other areas. He is also interested in computing education more broadly and has authored a book on programming for everyone.

== Leadership and Service ==
Littman has chaired the panel for The One Hundred‑Year Study on Artificial Intelligence (AI100) 2021 Report and will chair the standing committee for the 2026 report. During his time at the National Science Foundation, he co-led the development of the 2023 National Strategic Artificial Intelligence Research and Development Strategic Plan.

== Personal Notes ==
- Littman is also known for his playful approach to communication. He has produced multiple education and parody videos (for example a machine-learning version of Michael Jackson’s Thriller with his oft-collaborator Charles Lee Isbell, Jr.) as part of his teaching outreach.
- Among his hobbies, he has been noted riding an electric unicycle to his office at the NSF.

== Awards ==
- Elected as an ACM Fellow in 2018 for "contributions to the design and analysis of sequential decision-making algorithms in artificial intelligence".
- Winner of the IFAAMAS Influential Paper Award (2014)
- Winner of the AAAI “Shakey” Award for Overfitting: Machine Learning Music Video (2014)
- Elected as a AAAI Fellow in 2010 for "significant contributions to the fields of reinforcement learning, decision making under uncertainty, and statistical language applications".
- Winner of the AAAI “Shakey” Award for Short Video for Aibo Ingenuity (2007)
- Winner of the Warren I. Susman Award for Excellence in Teaching at Rutgers (2011)
- Winner of the Robert B. Cox Award at Duke (1999)
- Winner of the AAAI Outstanding Paper Award (1999)

== Bibliography ==
- Littman, Michael L.; Sutton, Richard S.; Singh, Satinder (2002). "Predictive Representations of State" (PDF). Advances in Neural Information Processing Systems 14 (NIPS). pp. 1555–1561.
- Littman, Michael L.; Keim, Greg A.; Shazeer, Noam M. (1999). "Solving crosswords with PROVERB". Proceedings of the Sixteenth National Conference on Artificial Intelligence (AAAI). American Association for Artificial Intelligence. pp. 914–915.
- Kaelbling, Leslie P.; Littman, Michael L.; Moore, Andrew W. (1996). "Reinforcement Learning: A Survey". Journal of Artificial Intelligence Research. 4: 237–285. arXiv:cs/9605103. doi:10.1613/jair.301.
- Littman, Michael L. (1994). "Markov Games as a Framework for Multi-Agent Reinforcement Learning". International Conference on Machine Learning (ICML). pp. 157–163.
