= Shimon Ullman =

Israeli computer scientist

- שמעון אולמן
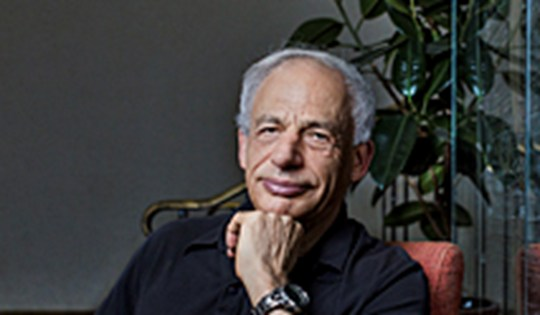
- Born: 28 January 1948 (age 78)
- Education: Massachusetts Institute of Technology (PhD)
- Scientific career
- Workplaces: Weizmann Institute of Science
- Thesis: The Interpretation of Visual Motion (1977)
- Doctoral advisor: David Marr
- Notable students: Dov Dori; Ellen Hildreth; Daniel Huttenlocher; Yael Moses; Leonid Peshkin; Amnon Shashua; Demetri Terzopoulos
- Website: www.wisdom.weizmann.ac.il/~shimon

Shimon Ullman (Hebrew: שמעון אולמן; born January 28, 1948, in Jerusalem) is a professor of computer science at the Weizmann Institute of Science, Israel. Ullman's main research area is the study of vision processing by both humans and machines. Specifically, he focuses on object and facial recognition and has made a number of key insights in this field, including with Christof Koch the idea of a visual saliency map in the mammalian visual system to regulate selective spatial attention.

== Education ==
He received his Ph.D. from MIT in 1977 advised by David Marr.

== Research ==
He is the author of several books on the topic of vision, including High-level vision: Object recognition and visual cognition.

Ullman is the former head of the Department of Computer Science and Applied Mathematics at the Weizmann Institute.

== Awards and honours ==
Ullman was awarded the 2008 David E. Rumelhart Prize for Theoretical Contributions to Cognitive Science. In 2014 he received the EMET prize in the field of computer science for his contributions to AI and computer vision.

In 2015 Ullman was awarded the Israel Prize in mathematics and computer science.

In 2019 he won the Azriel Rosenfeld Lifetime Achievement Award in the field of computer vision.

He is the co-founder of Orbotech and a former member of Israel's Council for Higher Education.
