= Biometrology =

Biometrology refers to measurement and data activities that provide quantitative characterization of biology. Biometrology advances laboratory techniques regarding scalable bioproducts or services.

== Biometrology products ==
- BioBricks Foundation is charting a technical standards framework that will serve as the driver and promoter of a high-quality, technical-standards process for synthetic biology based on BioBrick™ parts.
- The Genome in a Bottle Consortium is a public-private-academic consortium hosted by NIST to develop the technical infrastructure (reference standards, reference methods, and reference data) to enable translation of the whole human genome sequencing to clinical practice. The priority of Genome in a Bottle is authoritative characterization of human genomes for use in analytical validation and technology development, optimization, and demonstration.
- Characterization of relative activities of a reference collection of BioBrick promoters in order to further support adoption of RPU-based measurement standards.

== See also ==
- Metrology
