= Yehoram =

Yehoram is a masculine given name which may refer to:

- Yehoram Gaon (born 1939), Israeli singer and actor
- Yehoram Ulman (born 1964), Russian-born Australian rabbi
- Yehoram, a main character in the Israeli sitcom Krovim Krovim

== See also ==
- Jehoram, various biblical figures
