= Bioderma =

French pharmaceutical company

- Company type: Private
- Industry: Pharmaceuticals
- Founded: 1977
- Founder: Jean-Noël Thorel
- Headquarters: Aix en Provence, France
- Key people: Jean-Noël Thorel; Jean-Yves Desmottes
- Products: Créaline; Atoderm; Nodé
- Revenue: €261.5 Million (2014)
- Number of employees: 1000
- Website: www.bioderma.fr

Bioderma Laboratories is a privately owned French pharmaceutical company that specialises in medication for dermatological and hair/scalp conditions, as well as for Pediatry and cell regeneration. It was founded in 1977, in Aix en Provence, where its headquarters still reside. However, in 2001, the company opened its first specialised biometrology laboratory for skincare research and development in Lyon. Its primary business sector is Dermatology, with products such as ABCDerm, Atoderm, Cicabio, Créaline, Hydrabio, Matriciane, Matricium, Sébium, White Objective, secure (skin care), Nodé (hair care) and Photoderm (sun care).
