= Yoram Chaiter =

Israeli researcher and singer (born 1964)

- יורם חאיטר
- Born: 1964 (age 61–62); Berehove, Zakarpattia Oblast, Ukrainian SSR, USSR
- Education: B.Sc. of Medical Sciences, Technion (1986); Doctor of Medicine cum laude, Technion (1990); Master of Medical Sciences, Technion (2004)
- Occupations: Physician, cancer researcher, epidemiologist, public health expert, quality in healthcare specialist, bass singer
- Known for: Research in nutritional epidemiology and colorectal cancer, quality assurance in healthcare
- Musical career
- Genre: Classical
- Instrument: Voice

Yoram Chaiter (Hebrew: יורם חאיטר) is an Israeli physician, cancer researcher, researcher in the fields of epidemiology, public health and quality in healthcare and bass singer. He was born in Berehove, Zakarpattia Oblast, Ukrainian SSR, USSR in 1964 and immigrated to Israel in 1973.

== Medicine ==
=== Medical career ===
He studied at the Faculty of Medicine, Technion, Haifa from 1982 to 1989. He received degree of B.Sc. of Medical Sciences cum laude in 1986 and received degree of Doctor of Medicine cum laude in 1990. He spent a year of Internship at Poriya hospital and Rambam Medical Center for 1989–1990 and in 2004 received degree of Master of Medical Sciences, Technion, Haifa. His M.Sc thesis theme was Nutritional Epidemiology of Colorectal Cancer- Carotenoids and his M.D. thesis theme was Epidemiology of Myeloproliferative Disorders in North Israel.

=== Occupation ===
He was Head Physician of Recruitment Center from 1990. He was Head of Medical Quality Control of Recruitment Centers at IDF from 1997. He performed nutritional epidemiology/carotenoid isomers research as part of MECC (Molecular Epidemiology of Colorectal Cancer) research, Department of Epidemiology and Public Health, Carmel Medical Center, Haifa. His research established the first carotenoid isomer database in food items and was the first to examine associations between dietary carotenoids intake and colorectal cancer risk. His studies demonstrated differences between the association of dietary intake of carotenoid isomers and colorectal cancer risk. The studies have shown that 9-cis beta-carotene isomer has a strong inverse(protective)association with colorectal cancer risk, while smoking attenuates the protective effects of carotenoids on colorectal cancer risk, thus smokers do not enjoy protective effects of dietary intake of carotenoid isomers, that are found mainly in fruits and vegetables. His medical activity additional focus is on quality assurance of medical procedures, instruction of fellow physicians in providing high quality medical services, establishing and training for the technical and administrative medical personnel, screening procedures among adolescents, epidemiology of medical conditions among the young population, epidemiological research of populations, and nutritional and cancer epidemiology. He is heading a research project including data on more than 114000 adolescents, aimed at identifying the main medical conditions affecting the adolescent population in Israel. Numerous research articles describe findings regarding BMI, respiratory conditions, heart anomalies, orthopedic conditions, refractive errors, congenital color deficiency and various risk factors that are associated with the conditions He is currently leading a project of screening procedures among young populations aimed at identifying high risk subgroups requiring intervention by primary and secondary prevention in order to lower morbidity and mortality risk, by ensuring best quality of healthcare and collaboration between the various medical authorities.

=== Publications ===
- Chaiter Y, Brenner B, Aghai E, Tatarsky I. High incidence of myeloproliferative disorders in Ashkenazi Jews in northern Israel: [Leukemia Lymphoma] 7:251, 1992(*)
- (*)Reference in Williams textbook of Hematology and Witrobe Clinical Hematology
- Rennert G, Almog R, Tomsho LP, Low M, Pinchev M, Chaiter Y, Bonner JD, Rennert HS, Greenson JK, Gruber SB. Colorectal polyps in carriers of the APC I1307K polymorphism: [Dis Colon Rectum] 2005 Sep. 22
- Chaiter Y, Ben Amotz A, Almog R, Low M, Rennert HS, Fischler R, Rosen G, Gruber SB, Rennert G: Smoking attenuates the negative association between carotenoids consumption and colorectal cancer risk- Cancer Causes Control. 2009 Oct;20(8):1327-38. Epub 2009 Jun 27
- Chaiter Y, Rennert G, Fischler R., Rennert H.S., Rosen G., Gruber S.B., Ben Amotz A. Dietary intake of carotenoid isomers in Israel. [Int J Vitam Nutr Res.] 77(6): 398-405
- Chaiter Y, Gruber SB, Ben Amotz A, Rennert HS, Fischler R, Rosen G, Rennert G.Dietary intake of carotenoid isomers and tumor site associations in colorectal cancer(submitted)
- Chaiter Y, Gruber SB, Ben Amotz A, Rennert HS, Fischler R, Rozen G, Rennert G.Carotenoid isomers intake modifies MSI tumor status in colorectal cancer(in preparation)
- Chaiter Y, Gruber SB, Ben Amotz A, Rennert HS, Fischler R, Rozen G, Rennert G. Carotenoid isomers intake and APC I1307K polymorphism in colorectal cancer (in preparation)
- Chaiter, Y., Pirogovsky, A., Palma, E., et al. (2008), Medical quality control in conscription centers- ten years of activity, Journal of Israeli Military Medicine.Vol. 5, No.2, pp. 75–9.
- Yoram Chaiter, Yossy Machluf, Avinoam Pirogovsky, Elio Palma, Avi Yona, Tamar Shohat, Amir Yitzhak, Orna Tal, Nachman Ash.
- Quality control and quality assurance of medical committees' performances in the Israel Defense Forces -International Journal of Health Care Quality Assurance, vol 23(5-6);507-15,2010.
- Yoram Chaiter, Elio Palma, Yossy Machluf, Avi Yona, Avi Cohen, Avinoam Pirogovsky, Tamar Shohat, Nachman Ash, Amir Yitzhak
- Quality assurance and control of medical committees' performance – intervention program for technical medical staff - International Journal of Health care Quality Assurance, vol.24(1-2);19-30,2011.
- Yossy Machluf, Avinoam Pirogovsky, Elio Palma, Avi Yona, Amir Navon, Tamar Shohat, Amir Yitzhak, Orna Tal, Nachman Ash, Michael Nachmann, Yoram Chaiter. Medical committees' quality assurance by computerized systems- accepted for publication in International Journal of Health care Quality Assurance.
- Asaf Vivante, Arnon Afek, Yael Frenkel-Nir, Dorit Tzur, Alon Farfel, Eliezer Golan, Yoram Chaiter, Tamy Shohat, Karl Skorecki, Ronit Calderon-Margalit. Persistent Asymptomatic Isolated Microscopic Hematuria in Israeli Adolescents and Young Adults and Risk for End-Stage Renal Disease- JAMA, Vol 306, No. 7, 729-736, 2011.
- Amir Navon, Yossy Machluf, Avi Cohen, Avinoam Pirogovsky, Elio Palma, Orna Tal, Yael Frenkel- Nir, Nachman Ash, Yoram Chaiter. Quality Assurance of Administrative Aspects of Medical Processes within the Framework of Medical Committees- Past, Present and Future Perspectives - accepted forpublication in Journal of Israeli Military Medicine.

=== Presentations at conferences ===
- Chaiter Y, Ben Amotz A, Almog R, Low M, Rennert HS, Fischler R, Rosen G, Gruber SB, Rennert G. Carotenoid isomers and colorectal cancer-Presented at CHS International Educational Conference on Cancer Prevention, May 2004.
- Schapiro S.M., Chaiter Y.Z., Karachun L.F., Timaner V.E., Agranovsky S.E.Medical and social-psychological consequences of the Chernobyl radiation accident on immigrants from the former USSR in Israel-Presented at Eco -Forum radiation medicine congress, Sankt Peterburg. Russia, 2008
- Yoram Chaiter, Avinoam Pirogovsky, Elio Palma, Yossy Machluf, Avi Yona, Amir Navon, Avi Cohen, Tamar Shohat, Orna Tal, Amir Yitzhak, Dov Albokerk, Nachman Ash. Quality assurance control at recruitment centers- More than ten years of experience.
- Presented at the 15th Annual Congress of the Israeli association of Medical Quality assurance and control, Tel Aviv. July 1 .2008.
- Yoram Chaiter, Avinoam Pirogovsky, Yossy Machluf, Nachman Ash, Orna Tal. Weight, height and BMI trends among Israeli adolescents -20 years of follow up
- Presented at the 14th National Congress of Health education and promotion, November 2008, Israel.
- Yoram Chaiter, Yossy Machluf, Avinoam Pirogovsky, Elio Palma, Avi Yona, Tamar Shohat, Amir Yitzhak, Orna Tal, Nachman Ash Quality assuring and controlling medical committees’ performances at conscription centres-chaired poster presentation at [International Forum for Quality and Safety in Health Care in Berlin] 17–20 March. 2009.

Yoram Chaiter, Yossy Machluf, Avinoam Pirogovsky, Elio Palma, Avi Yona, Tamar Shohat, Yael Frenkel, Orna Tal, Nachman Ash Medical committees at IDF- Management and quality control and assurance by computerized systems- poster presentation at the 16th Annual Congress of the Israeli association of Medical Quality assurance and control, Tel Aviv. November .2009. Yoram Chaiter, Yossy Machluf, Avinoam Pirogovsky, Orna Tal, Nachman Ash-Medical conditions in adolescents–from epidemiologic trends to a nationwide health project for disease risk reduction-Oral presentation at The 12th Biennial Conference of the European Association for Research on Adolescence, Vilnius, Lithuania, May, 2010

== Music ==
=== Musical career ===
Began musical studies by studying the piano. Studied voice with Ms Tamar Raz and also with Ms. Leane Dubin. Has been working and recording now for many years with coach and pianist Ina Weizmann and pianist Ira Zelikson. Participated in the Metropolitan Workshop with the Israeli Opera where he performed the role of Cardinal de Brogni in the opera La Juive by Halevy.

During his studies of medicine at the Technion began his long association with the Technion orchestra and choir. Performs constantly with the Technion Symphony Orchestra and Choir as a soloist, among the roles he performed are Colline in La Bohème by Puccini, excerpts from Boris Godunov by Mussorgsky and Escamillo in Carmen. Appeared in Macbeth by Bloch during the Bloch Festival held at the Technion. Among other operatic roles was Commendatore in Mozart's Don Giovanni with Haifa symphony orchestra under the baton of Noam Sheriff and Tamir Chasson. His long collaboration with conductor Leonti Wolf and the Tel Aviv philharmonic choir resulted in performances of Verdi's Requiem and Mozart's Requiem and the role of Dr. Dulcamara in L'Elisir d'Amore with Israeli chamber orchestra. In December 2008 sang with same conductor and choir the premiere of Irit Israelis' Cantata to 60 years of Israel independence at the TelAviv museum Rekanati hall. Concert repertoire also includes Stabat Mater by Rossini, Creation by Haydn, Messa di Gloria by Puccini, Beethoven's 9th Symphony, Verdi's Requiem, Vesperae solennes de confessore, Great Mass and Requiem by Mozart and Requiem by Faure. Repertoire also includes songs by Tchaikovsky, Rachmaninov, Mussorgsky, Brahms, Schubert, Wolf, Erwin Junger, Dvořák and others. Premiered David's song cycle by Israeli composer Erwin Junger in 1993. Made two recordings for the Israeli Radio (Kol Hamusica) in 1991 and 1996. Appeared in a recital at Kfar Bloom during the festival of Kol Hamusica in 2007. In 2004 recorded two song cycles by Erwin Junger, and in 2005 made a recording of songs by Erwin Junger on verses of Hungarian poets. These recordings were broadcast by the Israeli radio during 2006-7. The recordings including songs of other composers was released recently on Eroica records. Erwin Junger is an Israeli Transylvanian composer, that has written numerous symphonies, chamber music, choral and operatic works and songs. Yoram Chaiters' recording of the songs is premiere recordings of these works. In 2007 recorded Dvořák's Biblical Songs and Gypsy songs in Czech and a selection of Tchaikovsky songs. The recording was released in July 2008 by [Roméo Records] in the US and Europe. A new recording of fourteen Rachmaninov songs, a selection of Brahms songs and a selection of Schubert songs was released on Roméo records. A CD of Tosti, Respighi and Napolitan songs was released on Romeo records in 2011. His recording received high critical acclaim in musical magazines. In January 2010 appeared on the program Intermezzo hosted by Prof. Arie Vardi. The program was broadcast on Channel 1 of Israeli Broadcasting Authority and Israeli Educational TV numerous times during 2010-11. Radio broadcasts:Numerous radio broadcasts of all recordings on Kol Hamusica, Israeli Broadcasting Authority.

=== Discography ===
- Dvořák Biblical songs and Gypsy songs, Tchaikovsky songs-Roméo Records 7262, 2008
- Erwin Junger songs and Dvořák's Biblical songs(English)- Eroica records JDT 3414, 2008
- Erwin Junger, Sergei Rachmaninov, Franz Schubert, Johannes Brahms, Francesco Paolo Tosti:songs- Eroica records JDT 3415, 2009
- Songs by Rachmaninov, Brahms. Schubert- Roméo Records 7277, 2009
- Italian and Neapolitan songs- Roméo Records 7285, 2011
