= Hanan Yoran =

Hanan Yoran (Hebrew: חנן יורן) is a lecturer in the department of History at Ben-Gurion University of the Negev, Ahva Academic College and at the Interdisciplinary Center, Israel.

== Life ==
Hanan Yoran studied for his BA degree in Mathematics and Computer Science at the Hebrew University of Jerusalem and graduated in 1987. In 1999 he completed his PhD at the Cohn Institute for the History and Philosophy of Science and Ideas at the Tel Aviv University, under the supervision of Professor Rivka Feldhay and Professor Miriam Eliav Feldon. The title of the dissertation was: Erasmus and Thomas More between the Republic of Letters and the World of Politics.

== Works ==
Hanan Yoran main field of interest is intellectual and cultural history of early modern Europe, especially the various historical and theoretical aspects of the questions of modernity and secularization. His research focuses on Renaissance humanism, as the intellectual current that undermined the premises of classical and medieval intellectual tradition, and elaborated new language for understanding and representing reality. From this perspective he examined in his book, entitled Between Utopia and Dystopia: Erasmus, Thomas More and the Humanist Republic of Letters, the construction of the identity of the universal intellectual—the autonomous man of letters whose activity do not represent the ideology of a distinct social group, but rather the common good (as he understands it) – by the Erasmus and the humanists gathered around him in the beginning of the 16th century. Yoran also exposed the problems and paradoxes of inherent in this identity as well as the inability of the Erasmian humanists to account for and legitimize it in their own terms. From a similar theoretical point of view, Yoran examined in several articles the ethical and political views developed by various humanists, including More, Lorenzo Valla, the Florentine civic humanists and Machiavelli.

== Books ==
- Between Utopia and Dystopia: Erasmus, Thomas More, and the Humanist Republic of Letters, Lanham Md, 2010.
