= Yael Moses =

Israeli computer scientist

- יעל מוזס
- Education: Weizmann Institute of Science (PhD)
- Scientific career
- Workplaces: Interdisciplinary Center Herzliya
- Thesis: Face recognition: generalization to novel images (1994)
- Doctoral advisor: Shimon Ullman
- Website: www.faculty.idc.ac.il/moses/

Yael Moses (Hebrew: יעל מוזס) is a professor in the Efi Arazi School of computer science at the Interdisciplinary Center Herzliya, Israel.

== Education and career ==
Moses received her Ph.D. in computer science at the Weizmann Institute of Science, Rehovot. She was a post-doctoral fellow in the Robotics group at the University of Oxford from 1993 to 1994 and at the Weizmann Institute of Science from 1994 to 1997. Moses has been on the editorial board of the IEEE Transactions on Pattern Analysis and Machine Intelligence since 2013.

== Research ==
Her major research interests are in computer vision. In particular, her research focusses on multi-camera systems.
