= Jehoram =

Jehoram (meaning "Jehovah is exalted" in Biblical Hebrew) was the name of several individuals in the Tanakh. The female version of this name is Athaliah.

- The son of Toi, King of Hamath who was sent by his father to congratulate David on the occasion of his victory over Hadadezer (2 Samuel 8:10)
- Jehoram of Israel or Joram, King of Israel (ruled c. 852/49–842/41)
- Jehoram of Judah or Joram, King of Judah (ruled c. 849/48–842/41)
- A Levite of the family of Gershom (1 Chronicles 26:25)
- A priest sent by Jehoshaphat to instruct the people in Judah (2 Chronicles 17:8)

== See also ==
- Yehoram, a given name
