= Yoram Dori =

- יורם דורי
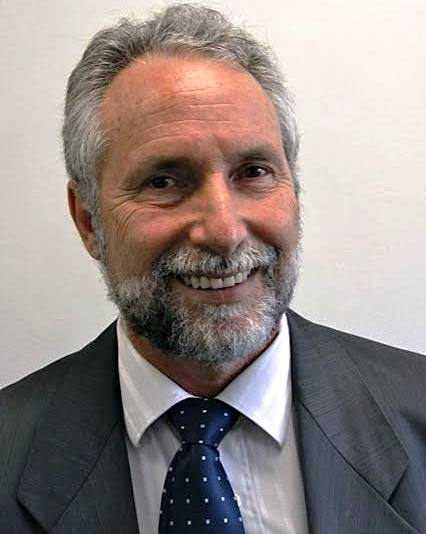
- Yoram Dori, 2015
- Born: 1950 (age 75–76)
- Education: Tel Aviv University

Yoram Dori (Hebrew: יורם דורי; born 1950) is a strategic advisor and biographies writer. He served for years as a close advisor for Israel's President Shimon Peres. Dori is the director general of Dori ltd.

== Biography ==
=== Early years ===
Dori was born in Tel Aviv. He served in the Israeli Army as an instructor for tank gunnery. In the Yom Kippur War, he fought in Sinai as a gunner in the 600 Tank Regiment. The tank was hit and the tank commander Mordechai Ilan Kitai was killed.

After his military service completed a B.A degree at Tel Aviv University Department of Political Science and Philosophy division. He earned a master's degree in the Department of Work Studies at Tel Aviv University.

=== Career ===
Dori served as acting secretary of the National organization of student members of the Israeli Labor Party. He worked as the manager of the youth department of the workers organization (Histadrut) in Tel Aviv and took charge of the press and public relations division at the Jewish Agency and the World Zionist Organization in Tel Aviv. He served as spokesperson for Agency Chairman Simcha Dinitz, The Moshavim movement, the 11th Maccabiah Games and 12th and as an executive member and spokesperson of Hapoel T.A. basketball team.

Dori served as the spokesperson and media advisor for the Labor Party under the chairmanship of Yitzhak Rabin, Shimon Peres and Ehud Barak. In the early millennium served as special advisor to the Peres Center for Peace.

After Peres was elected President of Israel, he was appointed as strategic advisor to the President. For many years he was the spokesperson of the World Restitution Organization (WJRO). He led the media campaign against Swiss banks on dormant accounts from the Holocaust.Yoram Dori is the spokesperson of "CIMI" and was for many years thespokesperson of "the society of preservation of heritage sites in Israel". Dori was the chairman of the board of Asia Pituach ltd and now he is a member of the board of Limmud fsu Dori published 3 book : the life story of Mati David and of Joseph Kamil 2 holaucost survivors

Dori also published a book "whispereing to his ear" about his 26 years as senior advisor to Shimon Peres.

Dori published opeds in Ma'ariv, Jerusalem post News1 and other newspapers. Dori is now the media advisor to a new established Jewish -Arab political party.

dori published two biographies of holaucost sorvivors: Mathi David and Joseph Kamil

== Personal life ==
Dori is married to Batia, has four children and 13 grandchildren and lives in Giv'at Shmuel near Tel Aviv.
