= Genome in a Bottle =

Consortium hosted by NIST

Genome in a Bottle is a consortium hosted by NIST and dedicated to characterization of benchmark human genomes. The NCBI is serving as the repository for the detailed information on samples, genotypes, raw sequencing reads and mapped reads, via a dedicated FTP site.
