= Peyman =

Peyman (/ˌpeɪˈmɑːn/ pay-MAHN), also romanized as Peymân (Persian: پیمان [pʰejˈmɒːn]), Paymān (Dari: پیمان [pʰajˈmɑːn]), or Paymon (Tajik: Паймон [pʰajˈmɔːn]), is a Persian and Kurdish given name and surname. In Persian, the name translates as 'formal agreement' or 'promise', and is also used to reference the Covenant in the Bible between God and the Jews. Notable people with the name include:

== Given name ==
=== Peyman ===
- Peyman Abadi (1972–2009), Iranian stuntman and actor
- Peyman Babaei (born 1994), Iranian footballer
- Peyman Esmaeili (born 1977), Iranian writer, critic and journalist
- Peyman Faratin (born 1965), Iranian computer scientist
- Peyman Fattahi (born 1973), Iranian reformist
- Peyman Ghane (born 1988), Iranian scene designer
- Peyman Ghasem Khani (born 1967), Iranian screenwriter
- Peyman Givi, Persian-American rocket scientist and engineer
- Peyman Hooshmandzadeh (born 1969), Iranian photographer
- Peyman Hosseini (born 1984), Iranian beach soccer player
- Peyman Keshavarzi (born 1995), Iranian footballer
- Peyman Milanfar (born 1966), American computer scientist
- Peyman Miri (born 1992), Iranian footballer
- Peyman Nasiri (born 1980), Iranian Paralympic athlete
- Peyman Qasemkhani (born 1967), Iranian filmmaker and actor
- Peyman Ranjbari (born 1992), Iranian footballer
- Peyman Salmani (born 1994), Iranian footballer
- Peyman Shirzadi (born 1988), Iranian footballer
- Peyman Soltani (born 1971), Iranian musician
- Peyman Talebi (born 1987), Iranian singer and TV host
- Peyman Yazdanian (born 1968), Iranian pianist and music composer
- Peyman Yousefi (born 1970), Iranian football commentator, television presenter and producer
- Peyman Pouyan (born 1984), Iranian Semiconductor Scientist

=== Payman ===
- Payman Maadi (born 1970), Iranian actor

=== Peiman ===
- Peiman Biabani (born 1996), Iranian wrestler
- Peiman Maheripour (born 1988), Iranian strongman and powerlifter
- Peiman Simani (born 1992), Finnish football referee

=== Peymane ===
- Peymané Adab, British physician

== Surname ==
=== Peyman ===
- David Peyman, American attorney and government official
- Gholam A. Peyman (born 1937), American ophthalmologist
- Habibollah Peyman (born 1935), Iranian politician
- Viyan Peyman (1988–2015), Kurdish singer and fighter

=== Payman ===
- Fatima Payman (born 1995), Afghan-born Australian politician

== See also ==
- Payman, monthly political magazine by Ahmad Kasravi
- Hasht Peyman, village in Iran
- Pejman, another spelling of the name
- Paymon (demonology), a name for the Goetic King known as Paimon in some grimoires, particularly in some grimoires where he is listed as one of the four kings of the cardinal directions.
