= SIGAI =

Interdisciplinary group of academic and industrial researchers

Association for Computing Machinery Special Interest Group on Artificial Intelligence (ACM SIGAI)
- Founded: 1966
- Purpose: Artificial Intelligence
- Origins: ACM SIGART
- Region served: International
- Website: sigai.acm.org

ACM SIGAI is the Association for Computing Machinery's Special Interest Group on Artificial Intelligence (AI), an interdisciplinary group of academic and industrial researchers, practitioners, software developers, end users, and students.

SIGAI, previously called SIGART, started in 1966, publishes the SIGART Bulletin and Intelligence Magazine.

== Purpose ==
SIGAI serves academic teachers and researchers, industrial practitioners, and students; and draws its membership from all three of these communities. Part of SIGAI's remit is to serve as technical experts on AI, both for the ACM community and external entities.

== Conferences ==
SIGAI supports several conferences.

- The ACM/AAAI Conference on Artificial Intelligence, Ethics, and Society (AIES)
- The International Conference on Automated Software Engineering (ASE)
- The ACM Computer Science in Cars Symposium (CSCS)
- The ACM Conference on Equity and Access in Algorithms, Mechanisms, an Optimization (EAAMO)
- The ACM/IEEE International Conference on Human–Robot Interaction (HRI)
- The International Conference on Neuromorphic Systems (ICONS)
- The International Conference on Intelligent User Interfaces (IUI)
- The ACM International Conference on Intelligent Virtual Agents (IVA)
- The International Conference on Knowledge Capture (K-CAP)

== Journal ==
ACM Transactions on Intelligent Systems and Technology (ACM TIST) is a scholarly journal that publishes the quality papers on intelligent systems, applicable algorithms and technology with a multi-disciplinary perspective. An intelligent system is one that uses AI techniques to offer important services (e.g., as a component of a larger system) to allow integrated systems to perceive, reason, learn, and act intelligently in the real world.

== Newsletter/Bulletin ==
AI Matters is the SIGAI quarterly newsletter featuring ideas and announcements of interest to the AI community. AI Matters is archived and made available in the ACM Digital Library.

== Awards ==
SIGAI has two main awards that are given out annually.

=== Allen Newell Award ===
The ACM - AAAI Allen Newell Award was founded in honor of Allen Newell.

=== ACM/SIGAI Autonomous Agents Research Award ===
Prior to 2014, it was known as the ACM/SIGART Autonomous Agents Award. Winners include the following:

- Munindar Singh, 2020
- Carles Sierra, 2019
- Craig Boutilier, 2018
- David Parkes, 2017
- Peter Stone, 2016
- Catherine Pelachaud, 2015
- Michael Wellman, 2014
- Jeffrey S. Rosenschein, 2013
- Moshe Tennenholtz, 2012
- Joe Halpern, 2011
- Jonathan Gratch, 2010
- Stacy Marsella, 2010
- Manuela M. Veloso, 2009
- Yoav Shoham, 2008
- Sarit Kraus, 2007
- Michael Wooldridge, 2006
- Milind Tambe, 2005
- Makoto Yokoo, 2004
- Nicholas Jennings, 2003
- Katia Sycara, 2002
- Tuomas Sandholm, 2001

== SIGAI Advisory Board ==
The SIGAI Advisory Board is composed of:

- Thomas G. Dietterich
- James A. Hendler
- Haym Hirsh
- Eric Horvitz
- Craig A. Knoblock
- Qiang Yang
- Peter Norvig

=== Previous Board Members ===
- Yolanda Gil
- James A. Hendler
- Haym Hirsh
- Eric Horvitz
- Craig A. Knoblock
- Qiang Yang

== SIGAI Officers ==
=== Elected Officers ===
The SIGAI committee has four Elected Officers:

- Nick Mattei, Chair
- Louise Dennis, Vice-Chair
- Alan Tsang, Secretary/Treasurer
- Sanmay Das, Past Chair

==== Previous Elected Officers ====
Previous elected officers for SIGAI include:

- Yolanda Gil (Chair)
- Sanmay Das (Vice-Chair)
- Susan L. Epstein (Secretary-Treasurer)
- Maria Gini (Past Chair)

=== Appointed Officers ===
The SIGAI committee can also appoint officers to perform particular roles.

SIGAI's current Appointed Officers are:

- Ziyu Yao, Newsletter Editor-in-Chief
- Anuj Karpatne, Newsletter Editor-in-Chief
- Lirong Xia, Conference Coordination Officer
- Todd Neller, Education Activities Officer
- Larry Medsker, Public Policy Officer
- Matt Luckcuck, Information Officer
- Alan Tsang, Information Officer

==== Previous Elected Officers ====
SIGAI's previous elected officers include:

- Eric Eaton, Newsletter Editor
- Amy McGovern, Newsletter Co-editor
- Doug Lange, News Officer
- Sven Koenig, Conference Coordination Officer
- Gabor Melli, Publications Officer
- Smiljana Petrovic, Membership and Outreach Officer
- Tom Dietterich, Public Policy Officer
- Mehran Sahami, Education Activities Liaison
- Peter Norvig, Education Activities Liaison
- Allen Lavoie, Information Officer

== See also ==
- Association for Computing Machinery
