= Mitra Haji Najafi =

- Born: Mitra Haji Najafi; December 16, 1958; Tehran iran
- Citizenship: Iran
- Website: https://naturefront.org

Mitra Haji Najafi (born 16 December 1958) is an Iranian publisher and environmental activist.

Najafi was the managing director of Taalim-e-Hagh Publication Office (meaning the true teachings), publishing spiritual books. She was born in Tehran, and was a member of the board of directors at Nature Front Association. She has served on the board of directors of The Institute of Celestial Arts of Living. She belongs to a group who are followers of Peyman Fattahi (known as Master Elia). They are also known as the El-Yasin Community.

Since 2005, following Fattahi's conventions and lectures, El-Yasin affiliated institutions have faced problems with the Ministry of Intelligence of the Islamic Republic of Iran. For Najafi, the pressures first appeared in the form of a refusal to authorize her to publish books. Later, books published by her institution were banned from exhibitions and shops. The booth of Taalime-Hagh Publication was closed down at the Tehran International Book Fair by the security agents (16th International Book Fair - 2005). She received a summons, along with a number of other directors of El-Yasin's publications and institutions. She was finally arrested, along with her 26-year-old son, in a planned operation, and both were taken to ward 209 of Evin Prison.

She was accused of publishing the book "The Flow of Divine Guidance" which was a collection of lectures by Elia Ramollah (Peyman Fattahi), and its cover design became a charge against him and Mitra Najafi, the editor-in-chief of Taalime-Hagh publication house. She was released after five months in prison, but her publication office license was never renewed by the Ministry of Culture and Islamic Guidance.

== Publication activities ==
Mitra Haji Najafi began publishing spiritual books by establishing Taalim-e-Hagh (sacred teachings) publication office after joining the El-Yasin Community. She has attended the International Book Fair since 1998 but at the 18th International Book Fair in 2005, the Taalim-e-Hagh booth, which had participated with 14 titles of books, was prevented from attending the exhibition, despite having the exhibitor permit. Mitra Haji Najafi lodged a complaint against the exhibition authorities, which eventually won the case at the Administrative Justice Court, but her publishing license was never renewed, and since then Taalim-e-Hagh has not been allowed to participate in any book fair.

== Environmental activities ==
In 1999, Mitra Haji Najafi established the Nature Front Association, along with a number of other environmental activists, then expanded its activity to protect the environment and animals. Nature Front Association activities include the shelter construction for swan and migratory birds (next to the Anzali Wetland) and the creation of a bird garden site in Selke. In 2016, with the arrival of deadly bird flu (avian influenza) in Iran, a book entitled "Lethal Influenza" was published by the Nature Front Association. The book warned the possibility of avian influenza virus mutations (it was published in 2006, but the second edition in 2016 did not have permission to be published)

== Detention and Imprisonment ==
Since 2003, Mitra Haji Najafi has been repeatedly summoned by Iran's “Religions Bureau” because of her membership at El-Yasin Community and her activities in holding public lectures for Peyman Fattahi. This caused the Ministry of Islamic Culture and Guidance to prevent Taalim-e-Hagh from publishing any further books. Later on, those books published by the publication office on her responsibility were confiscated and banned from the bookstores and International Book Fair. The outcome of Haji Najafi's complaint obliged the Ministry of Islamic Culture and Guidance to pay for compensation. She was not compensated but was banned from continuing to publish. In March 2009, while visiting a government organization to pursue the case of El-Yasin Community, Mitra Haji Najafi and her son (Aliyar Nickfarman) were detained and transferred to Ward 209 of Evin Prison. The incident was shortly after the second detention of Peyman Fattahi. Najafi spent 45 days in solitary confinement, then was the cell-mate of Roxana Saberi for another month. Prevented from meeting her legal representative, she claims she was interrogated in the hope of her making a false confession against Peyman Fatahi and other members of El-Yasin Community. She spent two months in prison with no contacts. Mrs. Haji Najafi conducted interviews with some international media (Voice of America and Radio Farda) during the first detention of Peyman Fattahi and other El-Yasin members. In those interviews, she reported on the situation of Fattahi and other detained members. Later, those interviews turned into allegations of propaganda against the regime.

== International reports ==
News about the detainees of Najafi and other members of the El-Yasin community was reported in the 2009 annual reports of the US Department of State, Amnesty International, FIDH, and the International Campaign for Human Rights. Roxana Saberi has also devoted pages in her book (Between Two Worlds) to Mrs.Haji Najafi and El-Yasin Community.

== After release ==
Her publishing and cultural activities were halted, but she continued as an environmental advocate for studies and investigations into the indiscriminate killing of migratory birds in north Iran. Also, she has worked on the mortality of cranes in Arak and Mazandaran ports.

== See also ==
- Peyman Fattahi
- Elyasin community
- Roxana Saberi
