= The Secret of Armageddon =

- Genre: Politics
- Created by: Islamic Republic of Iran News Network
- Developed by: IRIB TV1, IRINN
- Country of origin: Iran
- Original language: Persian
- No. of seasons: 4
- No. of episodes: 104

Production
- Production location: Iran

Original release
- Release: May 1, 2008

The Secret of Armageddon is a television series produced by Reza Jafarian and Saeed Mostaghasi of Islamic Republic of Iran Broadcasting (IRIB). The series was broadcast in four seasons: "The Secret of Armageddon", "The Secret of Armageddon 2: Army of Shadows", "Secret of Armageddon 3: Temple of Darkness" and "Secret of Armageddon 4: Ghost Project". Broadcast on IRIB TV1 and IRIB TV3 between 2008 and 2010, the series' fourth season was criticized at Tel Aviv University.

== Fourth season ==
According to the series' producers, its fourth season is based on domestic and foreign documents demonstrating the role of Zionism in using the media to wage a culture war against Islam, Iran and the Iranian Revolution. The series depicts the emergence of "new quasi-mystical and polytheistic sects" to turn young people away from monotheistic and Abrahamic religions.

== Partial episode summary ==
=== Episode 10: "Media Pluralism" ===
The episode alleges that post-Iranian Revolution media, except for IRIB and the Kayhan and Resalat newspapers, are financially and intellectually backed by Americans, Europeans, Masonic and Zionist foundations attempting to implement an "ideological collapse" which underlies a "physical collapse".

=== Episode 11: "Shock Corridor" ===
The episode alleges that the BBC is connected to espionage, the Baháʼí Faith, and Zionism.

=== Episode 12: "Attack of Waves" ===
In this episode, satellite television channels are claimed to be Zionist-American channels whose goal is to overthrow Iran's Islamic regime.

=== Episode 13: "Internet" ===
The episode examines large IT companies such as Facebook and Microsoft, alleging that the Internet is generally the product of the Pentagon in a digital Cold War and affiliated with Zionism. The trafficking of about 800,000 women and girls from the East to the West is a crime caused by the Internet.

=== Episodes 15, 16 and 18: Iranian cinema revisited ===
These episodes reexamine Iranian cinema, alleging that it was developed by Zionists and Freemasons and the country's first cinemas were established by graduates of Zionist schools.

=== Episode 20: "Coup d'état Terrorists" ===
This episode alleges that the Baháʼí Faith has been responsible for anti-Iranian and anti-Islamic events during the last two centuries and is connected to constitutionalism through Britain.

=== Episode 21: "Dream of the Promised Land" ===
This episode alleges that the Baháʼí religion is related to efforts by Israel, the CIA, and SAVAK to make Iran their promised land.

=== Episode 22: "Secular Dervishes" ===
This episode alleges that Shiite mysticism, Sufism and dervishes were developed by Zionists and Freemasons.

=== Episode 24: "Emerging Mysticism" ===
This episode alleges that mystics in sects founded by the Dalai Lama, Sai Baba of Shirdi and Jiddu Krishnamurti are promoted by Zionist and Freemason intelligence agencies, oppose waiting for the emergence of the Mahdi, and desire to conquer the world.

=== Episodes 25 and 26: "Peyman Fattahi and Mystical Anarchism" ===
These episodes were broadcast several times on IRIB in February 2011. They allege that Elia Ramallah, founder of the Elyasin community, claims to be a god and has misled Iranian youth. The episodes also criticizes Shimon Peres and accuses the CIA of being a Zionist sect intent on preventing the emergence of the 12th Imam of Shia Islam. Kayhan accuses a number of political and religious leaders of Satanism. The episodes were rebroadcast, coinciding with the 2011 anniversary of the September 11 attacks.

== Reaction ==
The program was reviewed at Tel Aviv University in 2009. According to Israel's Terrorism Intelligence Center 2008–2009 report, "This collection tries to follow Iran's anti-Zionist tendencies and tries to reflect the demands of the Islamic revolution against Israel in the world." The IRIB news channel's website posted about the series, "It is enough that Tel Aviv University, under a Zionist regime, analyzed The Secret of Armageddon and warned that it is a great danger."
