= Ghane =

Ghane is a surname. Notable people with the surname include:

- Peiman Ghane (born 1980), Iranian scenic designer
- Shojaat Ghane (born 1975), Iranian chess grandmaster

== See also ==
- Ghanem
