= Marios M. Polycarpou =

A Cypriot professor of electrical and computer engineering and researcher.

- Born: 1962
- Occupation: Professor

Academic background
- Education: Rice University, BA, BSc, 1987 University of Southern California, MS, PhD, 1992

Academic work
- Discipline: Engineering, Computer Science, Artificial Intelligence, Control Theory, Neural Networks
- Institutions: University of Cyprus 2001 - present Imperial College London 2019-present University of Cincinnati 1992-2001
- Awards: IEEE Frank Rosenblatt Award

Marios M. Polycarpou (Greek: Μάριος Μ. Πολυκάρπου; born in 1962) is a Cypriot electrical engineer, academic and researcher in Artificial Intelligence. In 2023, he was awarded the IEEE Frank Rosenblatt Technical Field Award, for contributions to the theory and application of neural networks and learning systems in monitoring and control.

== Early life and education ==
Polycarpou was born in Kaimakli, Nicosia, Cyprus. He studied at Rice University and the University of Southern California.

== Awards and honors ==
- IEEE Neural Networks Pioneer Award (2016)
- IFAC Fellow (2016)
- Cyprus Distinguished Researcher Award (June 2015).
- IEEE Fellow, for contributions to the theory and application of intelligent systems and control (2006).

== Selected publications ==
1. Polycarpou, M.M. (March 7, 1996). "Stable adaptive neural control scheme for nonlinear systems". IEEE Transactions on Automatic Control. 41 (3): 447–451. doi:10.1109/9.486648.
2. Polycarpou, M.; Ioannou, P. A. (March 1, 1996). "A robust adaptive nonlinear control design". Automatica. 32 (3): 423–427. doi:10.1016/0005-1098(95)00147-6 – via ScienceDirect.
3. Farrell, Jay A.; Polycarpou, Marios; Sharma, Manu; Dong, Wenjie (June 7, 2009). "Command Filtered Backstepping". IEEE Transactions on Automatic Control. 54 (6): 1391–1395. Bibcode:2009ITAC...54.1391F. doi:10.1109/TAC.2009.2015562.
4. Kosmatopoulos, E.B.; Polycarpou, M.M.; Christodoulou, M.A.; Ioannou, P.A. (March 7, 1995). "High-order neural network structures for identification of dynamical systems". IEEE Transactions on Neural Networks. 6 (2): 422–431. doi:10.1109/72.363477. PMID 18263324.
5. Dong, Wenjie; Farrell, Jay A.; Polycarpou, Marios; Djapic, Vladimir; Sharma, Manu (May 7, 2012). "Command Filtered Adaptive Backstepping". IEEE Transactions on Control Systems Technology. 20 (3): 566–580. Bibcode:2012ITCST..20..566D. doi:10.1109/TCST.2011.2121907.
6. Zhang, Xiaodong; Polycarpou, M.M.; Parisini, T. (April 7, 2002). "A robust detection and isolation scheme for abrupt and incipient faults in nonlinear systems". IEEE Transactions on Automatic Control. 47 (4): 576–593. Bibcode:2002ITAC...47..576Z. doi:10.1109/9.995036.

=== Books ===
1. Jay A. Farrell, Marios M. Polycarpou (2006). Adaptive Approximation Based Control: Unifying Neural, Fuzzy and Traditional Adaptive Approximation Approaches. John Wiley & Sons, Inc. ISBN 9780471727880.
2. E. Kyriakides and M. Polycarpou (2015). Intelligent Monitoring, Control, and Security of Critical Infrastructure Systems. Studies in Computational Intelligence. Vol. 565. Springer-Verlag. doi:10.1007/978-3-662-44160-2. ISBN 978-3-662-44159-6.
