= Paymon =

Paymon may refer to:

- Paymon, or Paimon, a spirit in European mysticism
- Paymon, a spelling of the Persian and Kurdish name Peyman
- Paymon (fl. 20th-21st century) German keyboardist for the band Dark Fortress
