= IJCAI Award for Research Excellence =

Artificial intelligence research prize

The IJCAI Award for Research Excellence is a biannual award before given at the IJCAI conference to researcher in artificial intelligence as a recognition of excellence of their career. Beginning in 2016, the conference is held annually and so is the award.

== Laureates ==
The recipients of this award have been:

- John McCarthy (1985)
- Allen Newell (1989)
- Marvin Minsky (1991)
- Raymond Reiter (1993)
- Herbert A. Simon (1995)
- Aravind Joshi (1997)
- Judea Pearl (1999)
- Donald Michie (2001)
- Nils Nilsson (2003)
- Geoffrey E. Hinton (2005)
- Alan Bundy (2007)
- Victor R. Lesser (2009)
- Robert Kowalski (2011)
- Hector Levesque (2013)
- Barbara Grosz (2015)

for her pioneering research in Natural Language Processing and in theories and applications of Multiagent Collaboration.

- Michael I. Jordan (2016)

for his groundbreaking and impactful research in both the theory and application of statistical machine learning.

- Andrew Barto (2017)

for his pioneering work in the theory of reinforcement learning.

- Jitendra Malik (2018)
- Yoav Shoham (2019)
- Eugene Freuder (2020)
- Richard S. Sutton (2021)
- Stuart J. Russell (2022)
- Sarit Kraus (2023)

for her pioneering work of the study of interactions among self-interested agents, creating the field of automated negotiation, and developing methods for coalition formation and teamwork, both as formal models and real-world implementations.

- Thomas Dietrich (2024)
- Rina Dechter (2025)
- Nick Jennings (2026)

== Winners of also Turing Award ==
- John McCarthy (1971)
- Allen Newell (1975)
- Marvin Minsky (1969)
- Herbert A. Simon (1975)
- Judea Pearl (2011)
- Geoffrey Hinton (2018)
- Andrew Barto (2024)
- Richard S. Sutton (2024)

== See also ==
- List of computer science awards
- Turing Award
