= R. Lanier Anderson =

R. Lanier Anderson may refer to:

- R. Lanier Anderson III (born 1936), Senior Judge of the United States Court of Appeals for the Eleventh Circuit
- R. Lanier Anderson (philosopher), American philosopher
