= Memetic Computing Society =

- Registration no.: T10SS0080G
- Purpose: Artificial Intelligence
- Location: Singapore
- Region served: International
- Website: memecs.org

The Memetic Computing Society is a society focusing on research in the area of memetic algorithms and evolutionary computation. The society is located in Singapore.

== Conferences ==
The Memetic Computing Society supports the following conferences.

- The IEEE/WIC/ACM International Joint Conference on Web Intelligence and Intelligent Agent Technology (WI-IAT).

== See also ==
- Association for Computing Machinery
- ACM SIGAI
- IEEE Computer Society
