= Lawrence Shapiro =

- Born: 1962 (age 63–64)

Education
- Education: University of Pennsylvania (Ph.D., 1992)
- Thesis: Representational Content in Cognitive Psychology (1992)
- Doctoral advisor: Gary Hatfield

Philosophical work
- Era: Contemporary philosophy
- Region: Western philosophy
- School: Analytic
- Institutions: University of Wisconsin–Madison
- Main interests: Philosophy of mind

Lawrence Shapiro (born 1962) is an American philosopher and professor in the Department of Philosophy at the University of Wisconsin–Madison. His research focuses in the philosophy of psychology. He also works in both the philosophy of mind, and philosophy of biology.

== Education and career ==
Shapiro graduated summa cum laude from Dickinson College in 1984, earning entry into Phi Beta Kappa society. He received his Ph.D in philosophy from the University of Pennsylvania in 1992. Shapiro married Athena Skaleris, a lawyer and together they moved to Madison, Wisconsin. They have two daughters, Sophia and Thalia.

He has published a number of articles in top-tier philosophy journals. He is also the author of The Mind Incarnate (MIT:2004), which challenges the widespread assumption that mental states can be 'realized' in a variety of different substances. Shapiro's argument has important consequences for a range of philosophical positions about the mind, including the functionalist analysis of mental states. He has also co-edited, with Brie Gertler, Arguing About the Mind, a book of readings in the philosophy of mind. He published a book on embodied cognition called Embodied Cognition, within which he lays out an in depth explanation of embodied cognition theories and their rivals. He has recently been awarded a Kellett Midcareer Award by the Graduate School of the University of Wisconsin-Madison.

== See also ==
- Functionalism (philosophy of mind)
