= Yolanda Gil =

Spanish-born American computer scientist

- Education: Technical University of Madrid; Carnegie Mellon University (PhD)
- Awards: ACM Fellow (2016); AAAI Fellow (2012)
- Scientific career
- Fields: Artificial Intelligence; Intelligent User Interfaces; Knowledge Capture; Scientific workflows; Semantic Web
- Thesis: Acquiring domain knowledge for planning by experimentation (1992)
- Doctoral advisor: Jaime Carbonell
- Website: isi.edu/~gil

Yolanda Gil is a Spanish-born American computer scientist specializing in knowledge discovery and knowledge-rich intelligent user interfaces at the University of Southern California (USC). She served as president of the Association for the Advancement of Artificial Intelligence (AAAI), and chair of the Special Interest Group on Artificial Intelligence (SIGAI) for the Association for Computing Machinery (ACM). Gil was appointed to the National Science Board in 2024.

== Education ==
Gil is from Madrid, and earned a licenciate in Computer Science from the Technical University of Madrid in 1985. She did her graduate studies at Carnegie Mellon University, completing her Ph.D. in 1992. Her dissertation on planning and learning was supervised by Jaime Carbonell.

== Career and research ==
Gil joined the Information Sciences Institute (ISI) at the University of Southern California (USC) in 1992. She is a research professor of Computer Science and Spatial Sciences, Senior Director for AI and Data Science Initiatives, and director of the Center for AI Research for Health.

=== Awards and honors ===
Gil was elected the chair of SIGAI the Association for Computing Machinery (ACM) Special Interest Group (SIG) on Artificial Intelligence for two terms, from 2010 to 2016.

She was president of the Association for the Advancement of Artificial Intelligence for 2018 to 2020.

She was elected a Fellow of the Association for the Advancement of Artificial Intelligence (AAAI) in 2012, a Fellow of the Association for Computing Machinery (ACM) in 2016 "for leadership in advancing the use of artificial intelligence in support of science, and for service to the community", and an Fellow of the Institute of Electrical and Electronics Engineers (IEEE) in 2021, "for contributions to geoscience and scientific discovery with intelligent workflow systems". She was also elected a Fellow of the American Association for the Advancement of Science (AAAS) in 2020 "for outstanding contributions to the field of artificial intelligence for supporting scientific discovery", and a Fellow of the Cognitive Science Society (CSS) in 2024 for contributions in cognitive frameworks for scientific discovery, scientific collaboration, and managing to-do lists.

In 2022, Gil became the first computer scientist to receive the Geological Society of America M. Lee Allison Award for Outstanding Contributions to Geoinformatics and Data Science.
