= Shun'ichi Amari =

Japanese scholar (born 1936)

- 甘利 俊一
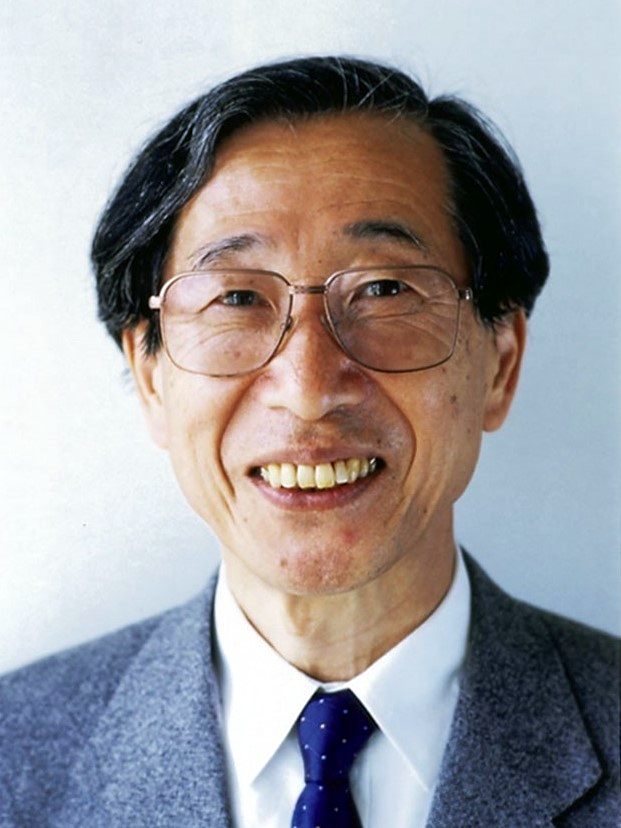
- Shun'ichi Amari
- Born: 1936 (age 89–90); Tokyo, Japan
- Education: University of Tokyo
- Known for: Information geometry Amari distance Artificial intelligence
- Awards: IEEE Emanuel R. Piore Award (1997); Kyoto Prize (2025); IEEE Frank Rosenblatt Award (2027)
- Scientific career
- Fields: Neuroscience
- Workplaces: RIKEN

Shun'ichi Amari (甘利 俊一, Amari Shun'ichi) (born 1936) is a Japanese engineer and neuroscientist, known as a pioneer of information geometry and artificial intelligence.

== Education ==
He majored in Mathematical Engineering in 1958 from the University of Tokyo then graduated in 1963 from the Graduate School of the University of Tokyo.

His Master of Engineering in 1960 was entitled Topological and Information-Theoretical Foundation of Diakoptics and Codiakoptics. His Doctor of Engineering in 1963 was entitled Diakoptics of Information Spaces.

== Career ==
Shun'ichi Amari received several awards and is a visiting professor of various universities.

He is the author of more than 200 peer-reviewed articles. He is known for developing information geometry. He also independently invented the Hopfield network in 1972, a form of self-organized recurrent neural network.

=== Artificial intelligence ===
Amari made significant advances in artificial intelligence. In 1967, he proposed the first deep learning artificial neural network (ANN) using the stochastic gradient descent (SGD) algorithm. The same year, Amari and his student H. Saito reported the first multilayer perceptron (MLP) neural network trained by SGD. The concept of backpropagation was also anticipated by Amari in the 1960s.

In 1972, Amari and Kaoru Nakano published the first papers on deep learning recurrent neural networks (RNN). The same year, Amari invented the Amari–Hopfield network. The Amari network, the earliest deep learning recurrent neural network (RNN), was first published by Amari in 1972. It was rediscovered by John Hopfield in 1982 as the Hopfield network.

=== Later career ===
He is currently holding a position of the RIKEN lab and is vice-president of Brain Science Institute, director of Brain Style Information Systems Group and team leader of Mathematical Neuroscience Laboratory.

== Awards and honors ==
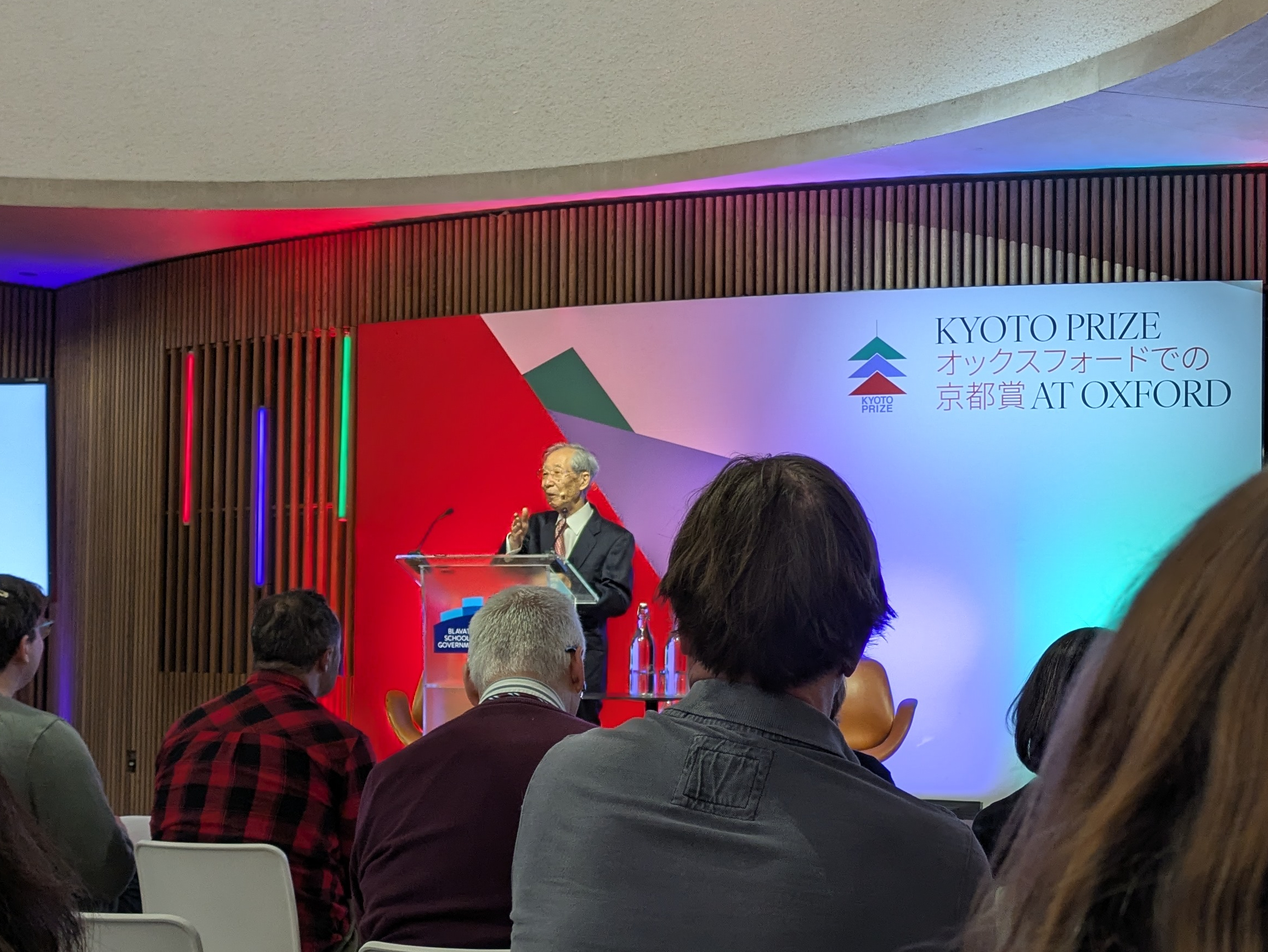
Shun-ichi Amari in 2026 speaking on his Kyoto Prize (2025)

- Japan Academy Prize (1995)
- IEEE Emanuel R. Piore Award (1997)
- C&C Prize (2003)
- Person of Cultural Merit (2012)
- Order of Culture (2019)
- Kyoto Prize in Advanced Technology: Information Science (2025)
- IEEE Frank Rosenblatt Award (2027), "For foundational contributions to neural network theory and information geometry".

== Notable works ==
- A Geometrical Theory of Information (in Japanese), Kyoritsu, 1968
- Information Theory (in Japanese), Daiamondo-sha, 1971
- Mathematical Theory of Nerve Nets (in Japanese), Sangyotosho, 1978
- Methods of Information Geometry, in collaboration with Hiroshi Nagaoka, originally published in Japanese in 1993 and published in English in 2000 with the American Mathematical Society (AMS).
