= Ian Kerr (academic) =

Canadian academic (1965–2019)

Ian R. Kerr
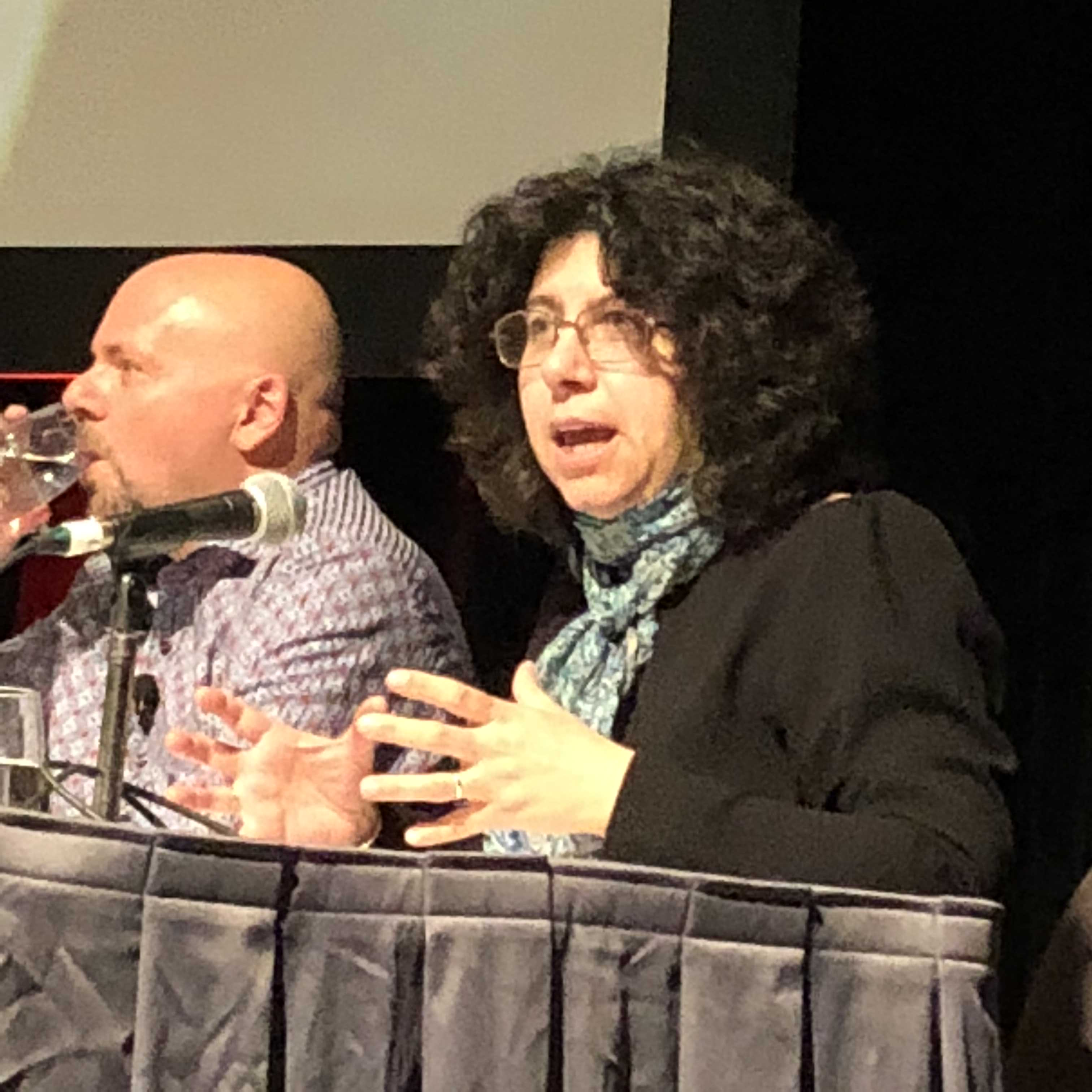
- Doina Precup with Ian Kerr (left) at the 2018 Trottier Public Science Symposium
- Born: January 1, 1965
- Died: August 26, 2019 (aged 54); Ottawa, Ontario, Canada
- Education: University of Alberta; University of Western Ontario
- Occupation: Professor
- Employer: University of Ottawa
- Title: Canada Research Chair in Ethics, Law, and Technology

Ian R. Kerr (January 1, 1965 – August 26, 2019) was a Canadian academic who researched emerging law and technology issues. He held a Canada Research Chair in Ethics, Law, and Technology at the University of Ottawa.

== Education ==
Kerr obtained a B.Sc. in Biology and a B.A. (Hon.) in Philosophy at the University of Alberta, along with an M.A. in Philosophy, an LL.B. (J.D.), and a Ph.D. in Law at the University of Western Ontario.

== Career ==
Prior to joining the faculty at the University of Ottawa, he held a joint appointment in the Faculty of Law, the Faculty of Information & Media Studies and the Department of Philosophy at the University of Western Ontario.

Kerr earned awards and citations, including the Bank of Nova Scotia Award of Excellence in Undergraduate Teaching, the University of Western Ontario’s Faculty of Graduate Studies Award of Teaching Excellence, the University of Ottawa’s AEECLSS Teaching Excellence Award, and the University of Ottawa's Excellence in Education Prize.

== Death and legacy ==
Kerr died on August 26, 2019, from cancer. In 2019 an award in his memory was established for law students at University of Western Ontario Faculty of Law. The University of Ottawa Faculty of Law established the Ian R. Kerr Memorial Fund and the Ian R. Kerr Fellowships.

== Publications ==
In addition to co-authoring the business law textbook Managing the Law, Kerr published in the areas of ethical and legal aspects of digital copyright, automated electronic commerce, artificial intelligence, cybercrime, nanotechnology, internet regulation, ISP and intermediary liability, online defamation, pre-natal injuries and unwanted pregnancies.

- Managing the Law: Legal Aspects of Doing Business, a law textbook for business students (co-authored by Mitchell McInnes, Anthony VanDuzer, and Chi Carmody)
- Lessons from the Identity Trail: Anonymity, Privacy and Identity in a Networked Society, edited by Ian Kerr, Carole Lucock, and Valerie Steeves
- Robot Law, edited by Ryan Calo, A. Michael Froomkin, and Ian Kerr
