= Harry Klopf =

American computer scientist

- Born: 1941; United States
- Died: 25 May 1997 (aged 55–56); New Carlisle, Ohio
- Occupation: Research Scientist
- Scientific career
- Fields: Computer Science, Electrical Engineering

Harry Klopf (1941 - 1997) was an American computer scientist and electric engineer who specialized in machine learning.

According to Richard Sutton and Andrew Barto, he was the "individual most responsible for reviving the trial-and-error thread to reinforcement learning within artificial intelligence".

== Biography ==
He was born in 1941. He was married to Joan Klopf. He died on 25 May 1997 in New Carlisle, Ohio.

== Education ==
Klopf studied electrical engineering and computer science and became an expert in both.

== Career ==
He worked as a senior scientist in machine learning at the Wright-Patterson Air Force Base.

He was the academic collaborator of Richard S. Sutton and Andrew Barto, both of whom have won the Turing Award.

== Bibliography ==
He is the author of a number of notable books:

- Brain Function and Adaptive Systems: A Heterostatic Theory
- The Hedonistic Neuron: A Theory of Memory, Learning
- A Neuronal Model of Classical Conditioning

== See also ==
- Hebbian theory
- Richard S. Sutton
- Andrew Barto
