= Alison Simmons =

American philosopher (born 1965)

- Born: 1965 (age 60–61)
- Education: Bucknell University (B.A.); University of Pennsylvania (Ph.D.)
- Awards: Harvard Phi Beta Kappa Teaching Prize (2014)
- Scientific career
- Fields: Early modern theories of mind
- Workplaces: Harvard University
- Doctoral advisor: Gary Hatfield

Alison Simmons (born 1965) is an American philosopher and Samuel H. Wolcott Professor of Philosophy and Harvard College Professor at Harvard University. Her primary scholarly interests are in early modern theories of mind (17th–18th centuries), the relationship between mind and body, natural philosophy, and sensory perception. With Barbara Grosz, she is co-founder of the Embedded EthiCS program at Harvard, which embeds ethics lessons into computer science courses.

== Education and career ==
Simmons studied psychology as an undergraduate at Bucknell University, graduating summa cum laude with highest honors in psychology in 1987. She initially attended Cornell University as a graduate student, studying cognitive and perceptual psychology with Elizabeth Spelke. She transferred a year later to the University of Pennsylvania to study philosophy under the direction of Gary Hatfield. She received her Ph.D. in philosophy from Penn in 1994 and took her first academic job as assistant professor at Harvard University. She was promoted to John L. Loeb Associate Professor of Philosophy in 1999. In 2002, she became the first woman to be tenured from a junior faculty position within Harvard's philosophy department. (Gisela Striker is the first woman to have a tenured position in the department, in 1989.) In 2008 Simmons was named the Samuel H. Wolcott Professor of Philosophy, and in 2011 she was named a Harvard College Professor.

As a graduate student, Simmons held fellowships from the National Science Foundation and the National Endowment for the Humanities. She was named a Dean's Scholar in 1993. At Harvard, she has been awarded a John L. Loeb Associate Professorship, the inaugural Samuel H. Wolcott Professorship, and a five-year Harvard College Professorship. Her article, "Changing the Cartesian Mind" was selected as one of the ten best articles of 2001 by the Philosopher's Annual. Simmons' work on Descartes has been particularly influential, and she additionally serves as a jury member for the million-dollar Berggruen Prize.

== Selected papers ==
- "Cartesian Consciousness Reconsidered," Philosophers' Imprint 12(2) (January 2012): 1-21.
- "Re-Humanizing Descartes," Philosophic Exchange 41 (2010-2011): 53–71.
- "Sensation in the Malebranchean Mind," Topics in Early Modern Theories of Mind, Studies in the History and Philosophy of Mind 9, edited by Jon Miller (Springer Press, 2009): 105–129.
- ""Guarding the Body: A Cartesian Phenomenology of Perception," Contemporary Perspectives on Early Modern Philosophy: Essays in Honor of Vere Chappell, edited by Paul Hoffman and Gideon Yaffe (Broadview Press, 2008), 81–113.
- "Spatial Perception from a Cartesian Point of View" Philosophical Topics 31 (2003), 395–423.
- "Sensible Ends: Latent Teleology in Descartes' Account of Sensation," Journal of the History of Philosophy 39 (2001), 49–75.
- "Are Cartesian Sensations Representational?" Noûs 33 (1999), 347–369.
- "Descartes on the Cognitive Structure of Sensory Experience," Philosophy and Phenomenological Research, 67, no. 3 (2003), 549–579.
- "Changing the Cartesian Mind: Leibniz on Sensation, Representation and Consciousness," The Philosophical Review, 110, no. 1 (January, 2001). Reprinted in The Philosopher's Annual XXIV, 2002.
