= International Conference on Human–Robot Interaction =

Annual conference series on human–robot interaction

The ACM/IEEE International Conference on Human-Robot Interaction (HRI) is an annual conference "focusing on human-robot interaction with roots in robotics, psychology, cognitive science, human–computer interaction (HCI), human factors, artificial intelligence, organizational behavior, anthropology, and other fields". The conference is a joint undertaking of the Association for Computing Machinery (ACM) and the Institute of Electrical and Electronics Engineers (IEEE) organizations.

== See also ==
- ACM SIGAI
- Human–robot interaction
