= Sarit Kraus =

Israeli computer scientist (born 1960)

- שרית קראוס
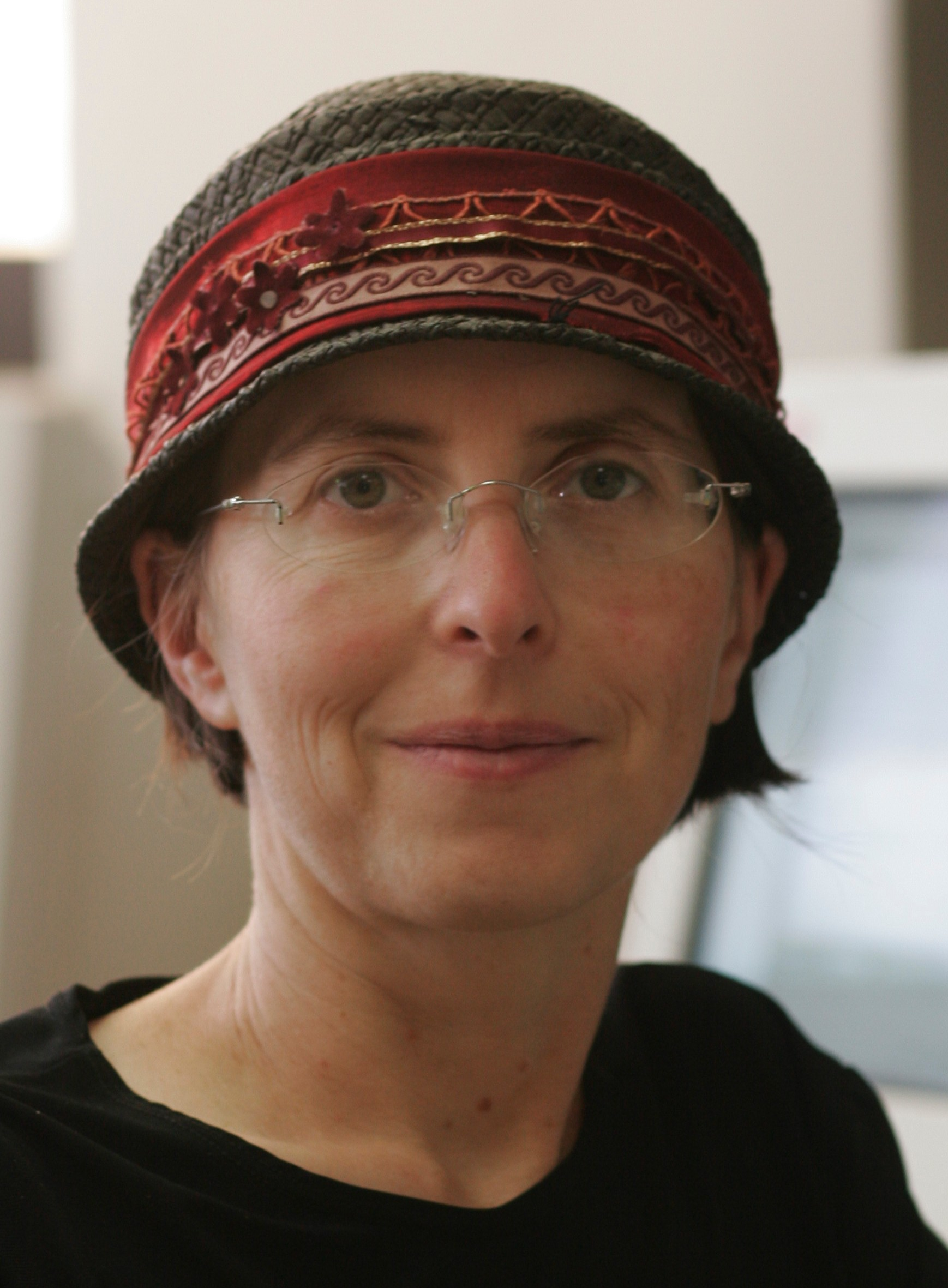
- Born: 1960 (age 65–66); Jerusalem, Israel
- Education: Hebrew University of Jerusalem
- Known for: multiagent systems, non-monotonic reasoning
- Spouse: Yitzchak Kraus
- Awards: IJCAI Computers and Thought Award (1995); ACM Fellow (2014)
- Scientific career
- Workplaces: Bar-Ilan University
- Doctoral advisor: Daniel Lehmann
- Website: www.cs.biu.ac.il/~sarit/

Sarit Kraus (Hebrew: שרית קראוס; born 1960) is a professor of computer science at the Bar-Ilan University in Israel. She was named the 2020-2021 ACM Athena Lecturer in recognition of her contributions to artificial intelligence, notably to multiagent systems, human-agent interaction, autonomous agents and non-monotonic reasoning, as well as her leadership in these fields.

== Biography ==
Sarit Kraus was born in Jerusalem, Israel. She completed her Ph.D. in Computer Science at Hebrew University in 1989 under the supervision of Prof. Daniel Lehmann. She is married to Prof. Yitzchak Kraus and has five children.

== Academic career ==
Kraus has made highly influential contributions to numerous subfields, most notably to multiagent systems (including people and robots) and non-monotonic reasoning. One of her important contributions is to strategic negotiation. Her work in this area is one of the first to integrate game theory with artificial intelligence. Furthermore, she started new research on automated agents that negotiate with people, and established that these agents must be evaluated via experiments with humans. In particular, she has developed Diplomat, the first automated agent that negotiated proficiently with people. This was followed with other agents that interact well with people by integrating qualitative decision-making approach with machine learning tools, to face the challenge of people being bounded rational. Based on Kraus's work, others have begun to develop automated agents that negotiate and interact with people. Consequently, Kraus's work has become the gold standard for research in negotiation, both among automated agents and between agents and humans. This work has provoked the curiosity of other communities and was published in journals of political science, psychology and economics.

Another influential contribution of Kraus is in introducing a dimension of individualism into the multi-agent field by developing protocols and strategies for cooperation among self-interested agents including the formation of coalitions. This view differed radically from the fully cooperative agents approach, commonly held then by the multi-agent community (then called Distributed Artificial Intelligence). Individualism is necessary for reliably constraining the behaviour in open environments, such as electronic marketplaces.

Together with Barbara J. Grosz of Harvard, Kraus developed a reference theory for collaborative planning (a TeamWork model) called SharedPlans, which provides specification for the design of collaboration-capable agents and a framework for identifying and investigating fundamental questions about collaboration. It specifies the minimal conditions for a group of agents to have a joint goal, the group and individual decision making procedures that are required, the way the agents' mental states and plans can evolve over time and other various important relationships among the agents, e.g., teammates, subcontractors, etc. Given the extensiveness of SharedPlans and its rigorous specifications, it has been the basis for many other works and was widely adopted in other fields (e.g. robotics or human-machine interaction).

Kraus is also highly recognized for her contribution to the area of Non-Monotonic Reasoning. She is the first author of one of the most influential papers in the area (KLM). Within the mainstream logic community, “KLM” semantics have had probably the greatest impact. According to her DBLP entry Kraus has 131 collaborators from all around the world and from different disciplines. She is the author of a monograph on negotiations and co-author of additional two books.

Kraus’ solutions have enriched the research community, but also bear practical fruits. Her research has induced the design and construction of real-world systems, which have transformed concepts from academia into reality. Kraus, together with Tambe and Ordonez from USC, developed an innovative approach of randomized policies for security applications. The innovative algorithm, which combines game theory and optimization methods, improves the state-of-the-art in security of robotics and multi-agent systems, and is used in practice at the Los Angeles International Airport since 2007. Her seminal research in the area of formal models of collaboration is used in industrial cutting-edge simulation technology and team-supported tools. Her work in developing Sheba's virtual speech therapist is currently being used for treatment by several Israeli HMOs. The Colored Trails game environment that she developed together with Grosz of Harvard provides a platform for researchers to conduct decision-making studies and is now used extensively by researchers from dozens of universities, as well as for training astronauts. Additional exciting recent projects of hers include building systems that negotiate and argue proficiently with people: her research on culture-sensitive agents has resulted in the development of numerous agents for cross-culture collaboration, with provable success in interaction with hundreds of people in America, the Far East and the Middle East---all believing that they interacted with a person, not recognizing that it was actually an agent. Her work on virtual humans has led to the development of a system for the Israeli police for training law enforcement officials to interview witnesses and suspects. Here, virtual psychological models of the suspect were developed, leading to diversified answers by the virtual suspect. Recently, she has developed an intelligent agent which supports an operator that works with a team of low-cost autonomous robots. Finally, together with the Israeli GM center, a persuasion system has been developed that generates advice for drivers regarding various different decisions involving conflicting goals.

== Awards ==
- 1995 IJCAI-95 Computers and Thought Award. The award is given by the IJCAI organization every two years to an ”outstanding young scientist"
- 2002 AAAI Fellow
- 2007 ACM/SIGART Autonomous Agents Research Award. The award is given by ACM SIGART, in collaboration with IFAAMAS, for excellence in research in the area of autonomous agents
- 2007 IFAAMAS Influential Paper Award with Barbara Grosz (joint winner)
- 2008 ECCAI Fellow
- 2009 Special commendations from the city of Los Angeles for the creation of the ARMOR security scheduling system
- 2010 “Women of the year” of Emuna
- 2010 EMET prize
- 2012 elected to Academia Europaea
- 2014 IFAAMAS Influential Paper Award with Onn Shehory
- 2014 ACM Fellow. "For contributions to artificial intelligence, including multi-agent systems, human-agent interaction and non-monotonic reasoning"
- 2020 ACM 2020-2021 ACM Athena Lecturer. "For foundational contributions to artificial intelligence, notably to multi-agent systems, human-agent interaction, autonomous agents and non-monotonic reasoning, and exemplary service and leadership in these fields."
- 2023 IJCAI Award for Research Excellence
