= Andrew Barto =

American computer scientist and professor (born 1948)

- Born: Andrew Gehret Barto; 1948 (age 77–78)
- Education: University of Michigan (BS, MS, PhD)
- Awards: IEEE Neural Networks Society Pioneer Award, IJCAI Award for Research Excellence, Turing Award (2024); IEEE Frank Rosenblatt Award (2026)
- Scientific career
- Fields: Computer science
- Workplaces: University of Massachusetts Amherst
- Thesis: Cellular automata as models of natural systems (1975)
- Doctoral advisor: Bernard P. Zeigler
- Doctoral students: Amy McGovern; Richard S. Sutton

Andrew Gehret Barto (born 1948) is an American computer scientist who is professor emeritus of computer science at the University of Massachusetts Amherst. Barto is best known for his foundational contributions to the field of modern computational reinforcement learning.

== Early life and education ==
Andrew Gehret Barto was born in 1948. He received his B.S. with distinction in mathematics from the University of Michigan in 1970, after having initially majored in naval architecture and engineering. After reading work by Michael Arbib, Warren Sturgis McCulloch, and Walter Pitts, he became interested in using computers and mathematics to model the brain, and five years later was awarded a Ph.D. in computer science for a thesis on cellular automata.

== Career ==
In 1977, Barto joined the College of Information and Computer Sciences at the University of Massachusetts Amherst as a postdoctoral research associate, was promoted to associate professor in 1982, and full professor in 1991. He was department chair from 2007 to 2011 and a core faculty member of the Neuroscience and Behavior program.

During this time at UMass, Barto co-directed the Autonomous Learning Laboratory (initially the Adaptive Network Laboratory), which generated several key ideas in reinforcement learning. Richard Sutton, with whom he co-authored the influential book Reinforcement Learning: An Introduction (MIT Press 1998; 2nd edition 2018), was his PhD student.

=== Reinforcement learning ===
When Barto started at UMass, he joined a group of researchers trying to explore the behavior of neurons in the human brain as the basis for human intelligence, a concept that had been advanced by computer scientist A. Harry Klopf. Barto was joined by his doctoral student Sutton in using mathematics toward furthering the concept and using it as the basis for artificial intelligence. This concept became known as reinforcement learning and went on to becoming a key part of artificial intelligence techniques.

Barto and Sutton used Markov decision processes (MDP) as the mathematical foundation to explain how agents (algorithmic entities) made decisions when in a stochastic or random environment, receiving rewards at the end of every action. Traditional MDP theory assumed the agents knew all information about the MDPs in their attempt toward maximizing their cumulative rewards. Barto and Sutton's reinforcement learning techniques allowed for both the environment and the rewards to be unknown, and thus allowed for these category of algorithms to be applied to a wide array of problems.

Barto built a lab in UMass Amherst toward developing the ideas on reinforcement learning while Sutton returned to Canada. Reinforcement learning as a topic continued to develop in academic circles until one of its first major real world applications saw Google's AlphaGo program built on this concept defeating the then prevailing human champion. Barto and Sutton have widely been credited and accepted as pioneers of modern reinforcement learning, with the technique itself being foundational to the modern AI boom.

Barto published over one hundred papers or chapters in journals, books, and conference and workshop proceedings. He is co-author with Richard Sutton of the book Reinforcement Learning: An Introduction, MIT Press 1998 (2nd edition 2018), and co-editor with Jennie Si, Warren Powell, and Don Wunch II of the Handbook of Learning and Approximate Dynamic Programming, Wiley-IEEE Press, 2004.

== Awards and honors ==
Barto is a Fellow of the American Association for the Advancement of Science, a Fellow and Senior Member of the IEEE, and a member of the American Association for Artificial Intelligence and the Society for Neuroscience.

Barto was awarded the UMass Neurosciences Lifetime Achievement Award in 2019, the IEEE Neural Network Society Pioneer Award in 2004, and the IJCAI Award for Research Excellence in 2017. His citation for the latter read: "Professor Barto is recognized for his groundbreaking and impactful research in both the theory and application of reinforcement learning."

In 2024, he received the Turing Award from the Association for Computing Machinery together with his former doctoral student Richard S. Sutton for their work on reinforcement learning; the citation of the award read: "For developing the conceptual and algorithmic foundations of reinforcement learning."

In 2026, together with Richard S. Sutton, Barto received the IEEE Frank Rosenblatt Award, "For contributions to reinforcement learning and artificial intelligence".
