= Munindar P. Singh =

Professor of computer science

- Education: University of Texas at Austin; Indian Institute of Technology Delhi
- Awards: ACM Fellow (2021); AAAS Fellow (2020); ACM SIGAI Autonomous Agents Research Award (2020); AAAI Fellow (2017); IEEE Fellow (2009)
- Scientific career
- Fields: Computer Science; Multiagent systems Artificial Intelligence
- Workplaces: North Carolina State University; Microelectronics and Computer Technology Corporation
- Thesis: A Theory of Actions, Intentions, and Communications for Multiagent Systems (1993)
- Doctoral advisor: Professors E. Allen Emerson (coadvisor) and Nicholas M. Asher (coadvisor)

Munindar P. Singh is a SAS institute distinguished professor and a full professor in the Department of Computer Science at North Carolina State University. Singh is an IEEE Fellow, a AAAI Fellow, a AAAS Fellow, an ACM Fellow, a Member of Academia Europaea, and a ACM SIGAI Autonomous Agents Research Award recipient.

== Education ==
Singh received his B.Tech. in computer science & engineering from the Indian Institute of Technology Delhi in 1986. He obtained a Ph.D. in computer science from the University of Texas at Austin in 1993 under the supervision of E. Allen Emerson and Nicholas M. Asher.

== Research ==
Singh's research interests include multiagent systems, service-oriented computing, software engineering, artificial intelligence, and social networks. He has made several important contributions to the understanding of interaction and norms in multiagent systems. He introduced to artificial intelligence the distinction between social commitment (a norm) and psychological commitment (a mental attitude). Singh also introduced the idea that interaction among autonomous social principals (e.g., between two or more organizations) must have a social semantics. This idea has proved to be highly influential within multiagent systems research. In recognition of Singh's contribution, the paper in which he introduced this idea was awarded the IFAAMAS 2016 Influential Paper Award. Taking this line of thinking further, Singh, in joint work with his Ph.D. student pInar Yolum, introduced the abstraction of commitment protocols.

Singh has also made important contributions to social networks, trust, and distributed computing. His Blindingly Simple Protocol Language (BSPL) introduces the idea that message ordering in interaction protocols fall out automatically from information flow requirements. Therefore, one need not model specify control flow at all in interaction protocols.
