= Victor R. Lesser =

American computer scientist

- Education: Computer Science
- Alma mater: Stanford University
- Awards: IJCAI-09 Award for Research Excellence

Victor R. Lesser is Distinguished Professor Emeritus in the School of Computer Science at the University of Massachusetts at Amherst and the Director of Multi-Agent Systems Laboratory. He is widely considered as the founding father of multi-agent systems. He received the IJCAI Award for Research Excellence in 2009.

Lesser is a noted researcher in multi-agent and blackboard systems. His major research focus was on the control and organization of complex AI systems. He also made contributions to real-time AI, computer architecture, signal understanding, diagnostics, plan recognition, and computer-supported cooperative work. He worked on applications in sensor networks for vehicle tracking and weather monitoring, speech and sound understanding, information gathering on the internet, peer-to-peer information retrieval, intelligent user interfaces, distributed task allocation and scheduling, and virtual agent enterprises.

Lesser is a Founding Fellow of the Association for the Advancement of Artificial Intelligence (AAAI) and an IEEE Fellow. He was General Chair of the first international conference on Multi-Agent Systems (ICMAS) in 1995, and Founding President of the International Foundation of Autonomous Agents and Multi-Agent Systems (IFAAMAS) in 1998. To honor his contributions to the field of multi-agent systems, IFAAMAS established the Victor Lesser Distinguished Dissertation Award. He received the UMass Amherst College of Natural Sciences and Mathematics (NSM) Outstanding Teaching Award (2004) and Outstanding Research Award (2008), and the Chancellor's Award for Outstanding Accomplishments in Research and Creative Activity (2008). Lesser was also the recipient of the IJCAI-09 Award for Research Excellence.
