= Amari distance =

Similarity measure between two invertible matrices

The Amari distance, also known as Amari index and Amari metric is a similarity measure between two invertible matrices, useful for checking for convergence in independent component analysis algorithms and for comparing solutions. It is named after Japanese information theorist Shun'ichi Amari and was originally introduced as a performance index for blind source separation.

For two invertible matrices $A, B \in \mathbb{R}^{n\times n}$, it is defined as:

$$d(A, B) = \sum_{i=1}^n \left(\sum_{j=1}^n\frac{|p_{ij}|}{\max_{k} |p_{ik}|} - 1\right) + \sum_{j=1}^n \left(\sum_{i=1}^n\frac{|p_{ij}|}{\max_{k} |p_{kj}|} - 1\right),  P = A^{-1}B$$

It is non-negative and cancels if and only if $A^{-1}B$ is a scale and permutation matrix, i.e. the product of a diagonal matrix and a permutation matrix. The Amari distance is invariant to permutation and scaling of the columns of $A$ and $B$.
