= Paul Guyer =

American philosopher (born 1948)

- Born: Paul D. Guyer; January 13, 1948 (age 78)

Education
- Education: Harvard University
- Thesis: Criteria for Judgment: Kant and the Problem of Taste (1974)
- Doctoral advisor: Stanley Cavell

Philosophical work
- Era: Contemporary philosophy
- Region: Western philosophy
- School: Analytic philosophy
- Institutions: Brown University
- Doctoral students: R. Lanier Anderson
- Main interests: Immanuel Kant, aesthetics
- Notable ideas: "Two object" interpretation of transcendental idealism

Paul D. Guyer (/ˈɡaɪ.ər/) is an American philosopher and a leading scholar of Immanuel Kant and of aesthetics. From 2012, he was Jonathan Nelson Professor of Philosophy and Humanities at Brown University until his retirement in 2023. In 2025, he was elected to the American Philosophical Society.

== Education and career ==
Guyer grew up on Long Island, New York, and attended public schools there, graduating from Lynbrook High School in 1965. He graduated summa cum laude from Harvard College in 1969, where he studied in the Departments of philosophy and German; his Ph.D. in philosophy was also taken at Harvard University, with a dissertation directed by Stanley Cavell. Guyer joined the University of Pennsylvania in 1983 as a tenured faculty member, where he subsequently rose to the rank of Professor of Philosophy and F.R.C. Murray Professor in the Humanities. Prior to moving to the University of Pennsylvania, Guyer taught at the University of Pittsburgh from 1973 to 1978, and the University of Illinois, Chicago from 1978 to 1983. He has also been a visiting professor at Harvard, Princeton, and the University of Michigan.

Guyer was elected a Fellow of the American Academy of Arts and Sciences in 1999. He has held fellowships from the National Endowment for the Humanities, the John Simon Guggenheim Memorial Foundation, and the Princeton University Center for Human Values. He has also been a Research Prize Winner of the Alexander von Humboldt Foundation of the Federal Republic of Germany and a Daimler Fellow at the American Academy in Berlin.

== Philosophical work ==
Guyer has written a dozen books on Kant and Kantian themes, and has edited and translated a number of Kant's works into English. In addition to his work on Kant, Guyer has published on many other figures in the history of philosophy, including Locke, Hume, Hegel, Schopenhauer. His works on Kant include Knowledge, Reason, and Taste: Kant's Response to Hume (Princeton University Press, 2008), and The Cambridge Companion to Kant's Critique of Pure Reason (Cambridge University Press). More recently, he has published Virtues of Freedom: Essays on Kant's Moral Philosophy (2016), Kant on the Rationality of Morality (2019), and Reason and Experience in Mendelssohn and Kant (2020).

His other areas of specialty include the history of philosophy and aesthetics. His three-volume work A History of Modern Aesthetics was published by Cambridge University Press in 2014. In 2021, Cambridge published A Philosopher Looks at Architecture. Guyer was President of the American Society for Aesthetics in 2011–13. Guyer was also President of the Eastern Division of the American Philosophical Association in 2011–12.

== Selected books ==
- Kant and the Claims of Taste (Cambridge, Mass: Harvard University Press, 1979)
- Kant and the Claims of Knowledge (Cambridge: Cambridge University Press, 1987)
- Kant on Freedom, Law and Happiness (Cambridge: Cambridge University Press, 2000)
- Knowledge, Reason and Taste: Kant's Response to Hume (Princeton: Princeton University Press, 2008)
- A History of Modern Aesthetics, 3 volumes (Cambridge: Cambridge University Press, 2014)
- Virtues of Freedom (Oxford: Oxford University Press, 2016)
- Kant on the Rationality of Morality (Cambridge: Cambridge University Press, 2019)
- Reason and Experience in Mendelssohn and Kant (Oxford: Oxford University Press, 2020)
- A Philosopher Looks at Architecture (Cambridge: Cambridge University Press, 2021)
- Idealism in Modern Philosophy (Oxford: Oxford University Press, 2023)
- Kant's Impact on Moral Philosophy (Oxford: Oxford University Press, 2024)

== See also ==
- American philosophy
- List of American philosophers
