= Doina Precup =

Romanian researcher of artificial intelligence

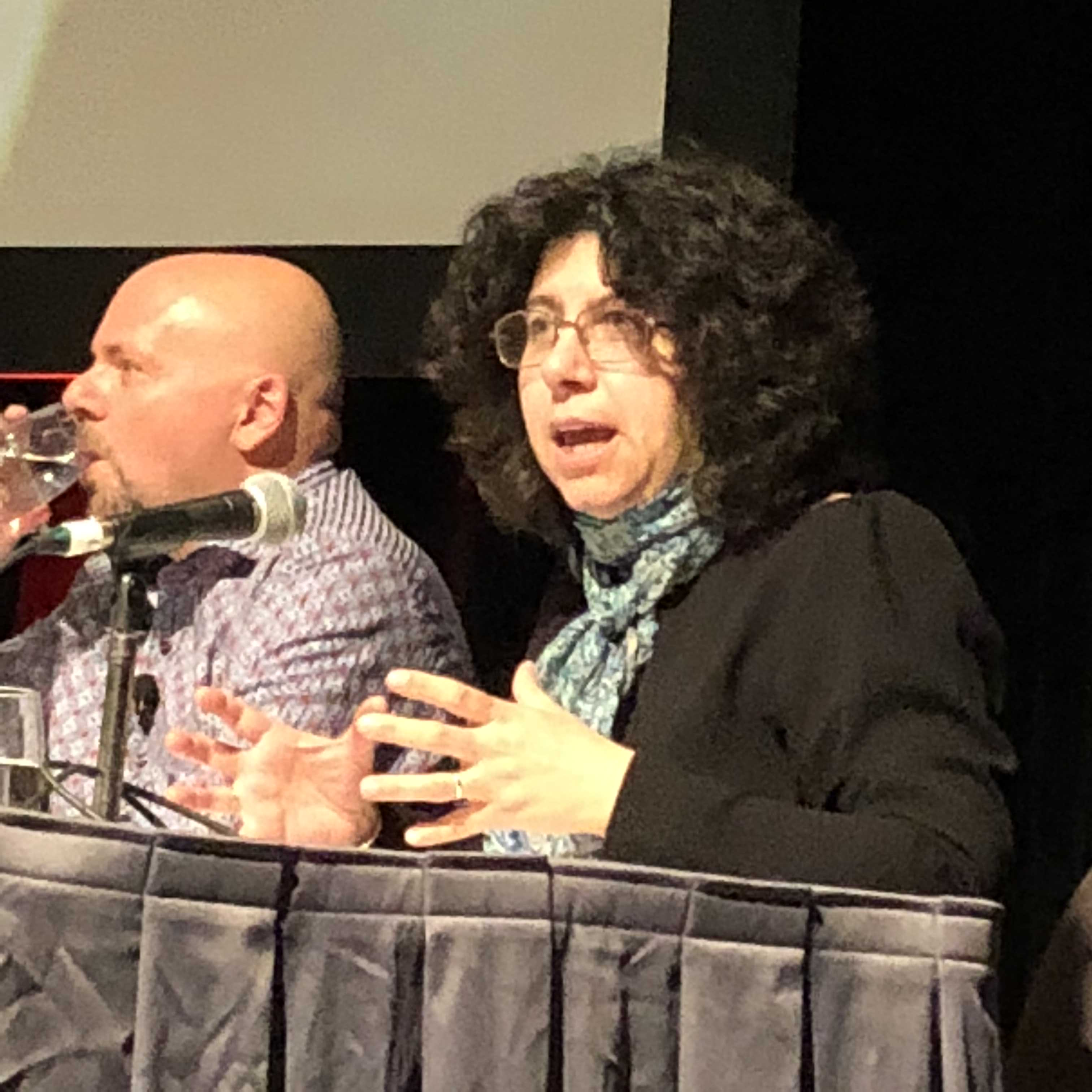
- Doina Precup with Ian Kerr in Montreal (2018)
- Education: Technical University of Cluj-Napoca, University of Massachusetts Amherst
- Scientific career
- Fields: artificial intelligence
- Workplaces: McGill University, Google DeepMind
- Thesis: Temporal Abstraction in Reinforcement Learning (2000)
- Doctoral advisor: Richard S. Sutton
- Website: https://www.cs.mcgill.ca/~dprecup/

Doina Precup is a Romanian researcher currently living in Montreal, Canada. She specializes in artificial intelligence (AI). Precup is associate dean of research at the faculty of science at McGill University, Canada research chair in machine learning and a senior fellow at the Canadian Institute for Advanced Research. She also heads the Montreal office of Google DeepMind.

== Education ==
Precup said she was drawn to the field of artificial intelligence at a young age by her interest in science fiction, where robots are often portrayed as useful and benevolent. Her mother was a university professor of computer science in Romania.

She obtained a bachelor of science degree in computer science and engineering (magna cum laude) at Technical University of Cluj-Napoca in 1994, followed by a master of science in 1995. She left Romania in 1995 on a Fulbright scholarship to pursue graduate studies at the University of Massachusetts Amherst, where she earned a master's degree in 1997 and a PhD in 2000.

Several women in Precup's family have had successful careers in science and the science program in her high school in Romania was well attended by girls. She only became aware of the gender imbalance in sciences and technology when she moved to North America. She decided to get involved in correcting this situation and does so as the co-founder and advisor of the AI4Good Lab, an organization that aims at getting more women to study and work in artificial intelligence.

== Career in artificial intelligence ==
Precup was recruited as an assistant professor by McGill University's School of Computer Science in 2000 and has since been living in the Montreal area.

In 2017, Precup was appointed to lead the Montreal office of the artificial intelligence firm Deepmind, which is owned by Google. She teaches at McGill while conducting fundamental research on reinforcement learning at Deepmind, working in particular on AI applications in areas that have a social impact, such as health care (medical imaging for example). She's interested in machine decision-making in situations where uncertainty is high.

She is a senior fellow of the Canadian Institute for Advanced Research, fellow of the Association for the Advancement of Artificial Intelligence and a member of the Montreal Institute for Learning Algorithms. With four other AI researchers (Yoshua Bengio, Geoffrey Hinton, Rich Sutton and Ian Kerr), she sent a letter to the Canadian Prime Minister in 2017 asking him to start addressing the risks posed by the development of AI-controlled weapons.
