= Brie Gertler =

American philosopher

- Born: 1967 (age 58–59)
- Education: Swarthmore College (BA); University of Pennsylvania (MA); Brown University (PhD)

Brie Gertler (born 1967) is an American philosopher who works primarily on problems in the philosophy of mind. A mind-body dualist, she is Commonwealth Professor of Philosophy and, as of March 2025, interim executive vice-president and provost at the University of Virginia. Her special interests include introspection, consciousness and mental content.

She has edited Privileged Access (2003), an anthology of papers on self-knowledge, and co-edited (with Lawrence Shapiro) "Arguing about the Mind" (2007), a reader in the philosophy of mind.

== Education and employment ==
Gertler has written numerous papers on her research and is a book reviewer. She received a B.A. with high honors in philosophy from Swarthmore College in June 1989 and an M.A. at the University of Pennsylvania three years later. In June 1997, she was granted a Ph.D. by Brown University.

Gertler first found employment as an assistant professor at The College of William & Mary, where she worked from 1997 to 2001, before moving on to the University of Wisconsin–Madison, where she earned tenure. She moved to her University of Virginia teaching position in 2004, was later department chair, and added the Vice-Provost title in 2021.

To the thirteenth edition of the Joel Feinberg- and Russ Shafer-Landau-edited Reason & Responsibility, Gertler contributed a paper in support of dualism. It explored the fundamentals of the mind-body problem and defended her philosophy against charges of "spookiness". Her argument is founded on the claim that, in feeling pain, we know the essence of the mental state of pain.

== Awards ==
- University of Virginia Summer Grant (Summers 2005, 2007).
- Fellow, Institute for Research in the Humanities, University of Wisconsin (Autumn 2004: declined).
- University of Wisconsin Summer Research Funds (Summers 2002, 2003).
- College of William and Mary Summer Grant (Summer 2000).
- NEH Stipend to attend a seminar on folk psychology, led by Robert Gordon University (Summer 1999).
- NEH Summer Grant (Summer 1998).
- Brown University President's Award for Teaching Excellence (Spring 1996).

== See also ==
- American philosophy
- List of American philosophers
- Nat Gertler (Brie's brother)
