= Gary Hatfield =

American philosopher

- Born: Gary Carl Hatfield

Education
- Education: University of Wisconsin–Madison (Ph.D., 1979)
- Thesis: Mind and Space in the Nineteenth Century: Helmholtz and the Empiristic Theory of Spatial Perception (1979)
- Doctoral advisor: Fred Dretske

Philosophical work
- Era: Contemporary philosophy
- Region: Western philosophy
- School: Analytic
- Institutions: University of Pennsylvania
- Doctoral students: R. Lanier Anderson, Lawrence Shapiro, Alison Simmons
- Main interests: History of modern philosophy, philosophy of psychology, theories of vision, philosophy of science

Gary Carl Hatfield is an American philosopher and Adam Seybert Professor in Moral and Intellectual Philosophy at the University of Pennsylvania. He is a specialist in the history of modern philosophy up to Kant, as well as philosophy of mind.

== Education and career ==
Hatfield earned his PhD from the University of Wisconsin, Madison in 1979. He taught at Harvard University and Johns Hopkins University before joining the Penn faculty in 1987.

== Books ==
- The Natural and the Normative: Theories of Spatial Perception from Kant to Helmholtz
- Perception and Cognition: Essays in the Philosophy of Psychology
- Evolution of Mind, Brain, and Culture
