= Pejman =

Pejman (/ˌpɛʒˈmɑːn/ pezh-MAHN), also romanized as Pežmān or Pezhmân (Persian: پژمان [pʰeʒˈmɒːn]), is a Persian masculine given name or surname. It may refer to:

== Given name ==
- Pejman Akbarzadeh, Iranian musician
- Pejman Bazeghi, Iranian actor
- Pejman Hadadi, Iranian musician
- Pejman Montazeri, Iranian footballer
- Pejman Rohanifar, Iranian Karateka

== Surname ==
- Ahmad Pejman (1935–2025), Iranian-American composer
- Bob Pejman, Persian-American artist/painter
- Hamidreza Pejman, film producer and founder of the Pejman Foundation
