= Hasht Peyman =

Hasht Peyman هشت پيمان
- Village
- Location within Iran
- Coordinates: 30°19′00″N 50°47′24″E
- Country: Iran
- Province: Kohgiluyeh and Boyer-Ahmad
- County: Gachsaran
- Bakhsh: Central
- Rural District: Emamzadeh Jafar

Population (2006)
  - Total: 65
- Time zone: UTC+3:30 (IRST)
  - Summer (DST): UTC+4:30 (IRDT)

Hasht Peyman (Persian: هشت پيمان), also romanized as Hasht-e Peymân and also known as Hasht Mehmân, is a village in Emamzadeh Jafar Rural District, in the Central District of Gachsaran County, Kohgiluyeh and Boyer-Ahmad Province, Iran. At the 2006 census, its population was 65, in 13 families.
