= R. Lanier Anderson (philosopher) =

American philosopher

- Born: Macon, Georgia, U.S.
- Awards: Dean's Award for Distinguished Teaching, Walter J. Gores Award for Excellence in Teaching

Academic background
- Education: Yale University (B.A., 1987), University of Pennsylvania (M.A./Ph.D., 1993)
- Thesis: The influence of perspective: An interpretation and defense of Nietzsche's epistemology (1993)
- Doctoral advisor: Paul Guyer, Gary Hatfield, Alexander Nehamas

Academic work
- Era: Contemporary philosophy
- Region: Western philosophy
- School or tradition: Continental
- Institutions: Stanford University, Harvard University, University of Pennsylvania, Haverford College, Bryn Mawr College
- Main interests: Kant, Nietzsche, Montaigne, Du Bois

R. Lanier Anderson is an American philosopher and J. E. Wallace Sterling Professor in Humanities at Stanford University. He is an expert on Kant and post-Kantian philosophy, and has published widely on both Kant and Nietzsche.

== Education and career ==
Anderson earned his Bachelor of Arts in philosophy from Yale University summa cum laude, with an exceptional distinction in the philosophy major. Anderson earned his M.A. and Ph.D. at the University of Pennsylvania in philosophy in 1993, and has been teaching at Stanford since 1996. Anderson has previously been a professor at Harvard University, the University of Pennsylvania, Haverford College, and Bryn Mawr College.

Anderson is the Executive Director of North American Nietzsche Society.

== Books ==
- The Poverty of Conceptual Truth: Kant’s Analytic/Synthetic Distinction and the Limits of Metaphysics, OUP, 2015
