= Peyman Faratin =

American computer scientist

- Born: September 16, 1965 (age 60); Tehran, Iran
- Citizenship: US and UK
- Education: University of London and MIT
- Known for: Automated Negotiation
- Awards: IFAAMAS Influential Paper Award
- Scientific career
- Fields: Computer Science
- Workplaces: MIT, Two Sigma, Mckinsey
- Thesis: (2000)
- Doctoral advisor: Carles Sierra; Nick Jennings

Peyman Faratin (born September 16, 1965) is an Iranian/American computer scientist, and the founder of Robust Links, an Internet company building algorithms for creating and processing a knowledge graph.

== Background ==
Faratin completed his PhD in computer science under the supervision of Prof. Nicholas R. Jennings and Prof. Carles Sierra. He made significant contributions in the area of artificial intelligence, particularly to automated negotiation in multi-agent systems. He was then a research scientist at MIT's Computer Science and Artificial Intelligence (CSAIL) laboratory, working with David D. Clark in the Advanced Network Architecture group.

== Selected publications ==
- P. Faratin, D. Clark, P. Gilmore, S. Bauer, A. Berger and W. Lehr (2008). The Growing Complexity of Internet Interconnections: Communications and Strategies, no.72, 4th quarter 2008
- D. D.Clark, W. Lehr, S.J. Bauer, P. Faratin, R. Sami, and J. Wroclawski (2006): Overlay Networks and Future of the Internet. In Journal of Communications and Strategies, 3(63), pp 1–21, 2006
- P. Faratin, C. Sierra and N. Jennings (2002): Using Similarity Criteria to Make Negotiation Trade-Offs. In Journal of Artificial Intelligence. 142 (2) 205–237
- P. Faratin, C. Sierra and N. Jennings (1997): Negotiation Decision Functions for Autonomous Agents in Int. Journal of Robotics and Autonomous Systems, 24(3–4):159-182
