= Nick Jennings (computer scientist) =

British computer scientist (born 1966)

Nick Jennings CB FRS FREng FCGI FIET FBCS MAE CEng CITP
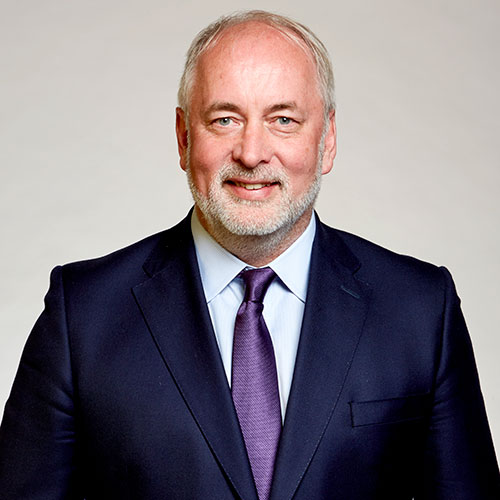
- Jennings in July 2022

Vice-Chancellor and President of Loughborough University
- Incumbent
- Assumed office October 2021
- Preceded by: Robert Allison

Personal details
- Born: Nicholas Robert Jennings; December 1966 (age 59) London, England
- Education: Weymouth Grammar School
- Alma mater: University of Exeter; Queen Mary University of London
- Salary: £350,723 (2022–23)
- Scientific career
- Known for: Regius Professor of Computer Science; Chief Scientific Advisor for National Security
- Spouse: Joanne Jennings
- Awards: IJCAI Computers and Thought Award (1999); ACM SIGART Autonomous Agents Research Award (2003); BCS Lovelace Medal (2020); IJCAI Award for Research Excellence (2026); IET Faraday Medal (2026)
- Fields: Artificial intelligence; Multi-agent systems; Computer science; Intelligent agents
- Workplaces: Imperial College; University of Southampton; Queen Mary University of London; Loughborough University
- Thesis: Joint Intentions as a Model of Multi-Agent Cooperation (1992)
- Doctoral advisor: Abe Mamdani
- Doctoral students: Peyman Faratin
- Website: www.lboro.ac.uk/services/vco/smt/vc-prof-jennings/

Nicholas Robert Jennings is a British computer scientist who was appointed Vice-Chancellor and President of Loughborough University in 2021. He was previously the Vice-Provost for Research and Enterprise at Imperial College London, the UK's first Regius Professor of Computer Science, and the inaugural Chief Scientific Adviser to the UK Government on National Security. His research covers the areas of AI, autonomous systems, agent-based computing and cybersecurity.

He has been involved in a number of company startups including Aerogility, Contact Engine, Crossword Cyber Security, Darktrace, and Reliance Cyber Science. He was the inaugural chair of the judges for the Manchester Prize for AI, and is a judge of the Queen Elizabeth Prize for Engineering.

== Education and early life ==
Jennings was born in London. He grew up on the Isle of Portland in Dorset and attended Weymouth Grammar School. He studied for an undergraduate degree in computer science at the University of Exeter and his PhD was from the Department of Electronic Engineering at Queen Mary, University of London.

== Research and career ==
His research focus is on developing AI systems for large-scale, open and dynamic environments. In particular, on endowing individual autonomous agents with the ability to act and interact in flexible ways, and with building systems that contain both humans and software agents that work together in partnership.

His systems have been used to save lives in the aftermath of disasters, to win Olympic medals for Team GB, and to monitor the impact of climate change on glaciers.

In undertaking this research, he has attracted grant income of £33M, published more than 700 articles (with over 480 co-authors) and graduated over 50 PhD students (including two winners and one runner-up of the British Computer Society (BCS)/CPHC Distinguished Dissertation Award.) He has over 100,000 citations in Google Scholar and an h-index of 139.

From 1988 he was at Queen Mary, University of London, where he was a PhD student, lecturer, reader and professor.

In 1999, he moved to the Department of Electronics and Computer Science at the University of Southampton where he was the Deputy Head of Department, the Associate Dean (Research and Enterprise) for the Faculty of Engineering, Science and Maths, the Head of the Agents, Interaction and Complexity group and the Head of Department. He was appointed the UK's first Regius Professor of Computer Science in 2014.

From 2010 to 2015, he was the UK Government's first Chief Scientific Advisor for National Security.

In 2016, he moved to Imperial College to be the Vice-Provost (Research and Enterprise), as well as a Professor of Artificial Intelligence.

In 2021, he was appointed as the 9th Vice-Chancellor and President of Loughborough University.

=== Awards ===
Jennings was appointed Companion of the Order of the Bath (CB) in the 2016 New Year Honours for services to computer science and national security science.

- 1999: IJCAI Computers and Thought Award
- 2000: IEE Achievement Medal for contributions to agent-based computing
- 2003: ACM Autonomous Agents Research Award for contributions to the field of agent-based computing
- 2004: Team leader of winning agent in the 20th Anniversary Iterated Prisoner's Dilemma Competitions
- 2007: Team leader of winner of Trading Agents Competition on Mechanism Design (CAT)
- 2007: ARGUS II project winner of The Engineer's Large Company / University Collaboration Award
- 2007: Int. Foundation for Autonomous Agents and Multi-Agent Systems Special Recognition Award for “Intelligent agents: theory and practice” in The Knowledge Engineering Review
- 2008: Winner of "Best Industrial Demonstrator" award at International Conference on Autonomous Agents and Multi-Systems Conference
- 2009: Winner of The Engineer Award for Best Aerospace and Defence Project for ALADDIN
- 2010: Winner of Best Paper Award at International Conference on Autonomous Agents and Multi-Agent Systems (out of 685 submissions)
- 2010: Winner 1st International Competitions on the Lemonade Stand Game
- 2011: Winner 2nd International Competitions on the Lemonade Stand Game
- 2012: Winner US State Department's TAG challenge on social mobilisation and rapid information gathering
- 2016: IJCAI-JAIR Best Paper Prize (Honourable Mention) for “Theoretical and practical foundations of large-scale agent-based micro-storage in the smart grid” in Journal of AI Research
- 2016: The Engineer’s “Collaborate to Innovate” Award for the ORCHID project
- 2018: Int. Foundation for Autonomous Agents and Multi-Agent Systems Influential Paper Award for “Developing multiagent systems: the Gaia methodology” in ACM Trans. on Software Engineering and Methodology
- 2020: BCS Lovelace Medal
- 2026: IJCAI-26 Award for Research Excellence
- 2026: The IET Faraday Medal

=== Fellowships ===
- 2003: Fellow European Association for Artificial Intelligence
- 2003: Fellow British Computer Society (FBCS)
- 2004: Fellow Institution of Engineering and Technology (FIET)
- 2005: Fellow of the Royal Academy of Engineering (FREng)
- 2006: Fellow Society for the Study of Artificial Intelligence and the Simulation of Behaviour (AISB)
- 2008: Member of the Academia Europaea (MAE)
- 2008: Fellow Institute of Electrical and Electronics Engineers (FIEEE)
- 2010: Fellow Association for the Advancement of Artificial Intelligence (AAAI)
- 2012: Fellow German Research Center for Artificial Intelligence (DFKI)
- 2019: Fellow City and Guilds of London Institute
- 2020: Honorary Fellow of the Cybernetics Society
- 2022: Fellow of the Royal Society

== Personal life ==
Jennings is married to Jo and they have two children.
