= Amy McGovern =

American computer scientist and meteorologist

Elizabeth Amy McGovern is an American computer scientist and meteorologist who uses machine learning to help predict severe weather. She is Lloyd G. and Joyce Austin Presidential Professor in the School of Computer Science and School of Meteorology at the University of Oklahoma, where she directs the NSF AI Institute for Research on Trustworthy AI in Weather, Climate, and Coastal Oceanography.

== Education and career ==
McGovern majored in mathematics and computer science at Carnegie Mellon University, graduating in 1996. She went to the University of Massachusetts Amherst for graduate study in computer science, where she received a master's degree in 1998 and completed her Ph.D. in 2002. Her dissertation, Autonomous discovery of temporal abstractions from interaction with an environment, was supervised by Andrew Barto.

She joined the University of Oklahoma as an assistant professor of computer science in 2005. She was promoted to associate professor in 2011 and full professor in 2018. She became an adjunct faculty member in the university's School of Meteorology in 2006, and became a professor in the school in 2020. The University of Oklahoma gave her the Lloyd G. and Joyce Austin Presidential Professorship in 2020.

== Recognition ==
In 2020, McGovern was named as a Fellow of the American Meteorological Society.
