= Catherine Pelachaud =

French computer scientist

Catherine Pelachaud is a French computer scientist specializing in human–computer interaction and known for her work virtual assistants and on recognizing and generating facial expressions. She is a director of research for the French National Centre for Scientific Research (CNRS), affiliated with the Institut des Systèmes Intelligents et de Robotique (ISIR), a shared research center of CNRS and Sorbonne University.

== Education and career ==
Pelachaud completed a Ph.D. in computer graphics at the University of Pennsylvania in 1991, jointly supervised by Norman Badler and Mark Steedman. After postdoctoral research at the University of Pennsylvania and Sapienza University of Rome, she became a professor at the University Institute of Technology of the University of Paris 8 Vincennes-Saint-Denis in 2002. She became a director of research for CNRS in 2008, affiliated with the Information Processing and Communication Laboratory (LTCI) of Télécom Paris, and moved to ISIR in 2016.

== Recognition ==
Pelachaud was the 2015 winner of the ACM/SIGAI Autonomous Agents Research Award, "for her sustained and substantial contributions to the area of intelligent virtual agents".

In 2016, the University of Geneva gave Pelachaud an honorary doctorate.
