= IEEE Frank Rosenblatt Award =

Science award

- Awarded for: Outstanding contribution(s) to the advancement of the design, practice, techniques, or theory in biologically and linguistically motivated computational paradigms, including but not limited to neural networks, connectionist systems, evolutionary computation, fuzzy systems, and hybrid intelligent systems in which these paradigms are contained
- Presented by: Institute of Electrical and Electronics Engineers
- First award: 2004
- Website: IEEE Frank Rosenblatt Award

The IEEE Frank Rosenblatt Award is a Technical Field Award established by the Institute of Electrical and Electronics Engineers Board of Directors in 2004. This award is presented for outstanding contributions to the advancement of the design, practice, techniques, or theory in biologically and linguistically motivated computational paradigms and systems, including neural networks, connectionist systems, evolutionary computation, fuzzy systems, and hybrid intelligent systems in which these paradigms are contained.

The award may be presented to an individual, multiple recipients, or a team of up to three people. It is named for Frank Rosenblatt, creator of the perceptron.

Recipients of this award receive a bronze medal, certificate, and honorarium.

== Recipients ==
- 2027: Shun-Ichi Amari
- 2026: Andrew G. Barto & Richard S. Sutton
- 2025: Yaochu Jin
- 2024: Bernadette Bouchon-Meunier
- 2023: Marios Polycarpou
- 2022: Paul Werbos
- 2021: James M. Keller
- 2020: Xin Yao
- 2019: Erkki Oja
- 2018: Enrique H. Ruspini
- 2017: Stephen Grossberg
- 2016: Ronald R. Yager
- 2015: Marco Dorigo
- 2014: Geoffrey E. Hinton
- 2013: Terrence Sejnowski
- 2012: Vladimir Vapnik
- 2011: Hans-Paul Schwefel
- 2010: Michio Sugeno
- 2009: John J. Hopfield
- 2008: Teuvo Kohonen
- 2007: James C. Bezdek
- 2006: Lawrence J. Fogel
