= Bob Pejman =

American artist

Bob Pejman (born 1963) is a contemporary artist/painter who currently resides in the United States. He is notable for his idyllic classical European renderings of such locales as Venice, Lake Como, and the Amalfi Coast in Italy.

== Early years ==
Bob Pejman was surrounded by art and music from an early age. The son of an operatic composer and a concert musician, he spent his early childhood in Vienna and then, by way of England, moved to the United States in 1976. Pejman began painting by the age of seven and pursued his art education through high school. However, despite his art instructor's insistence for him to pursue an education and career in art, Pejman decided to enter the field of business management. Upon graduating from Rutgers University and after numerous years of employment at software companies such as Control Data Corporation, Pejman secured a position as Vice President of Marketing at Information Resources, Inc., a global market research company.

In 1988, Pejman decided to return to the art world by opening a gallery in Short Hills, New Jersey called Pejman Gallery Inc. As a result of his direct exposure to fine art and contact with European masters whom he was representing at the gallery, he decided to start painting again. In 1991 he began his two-year formal studies with the Russian artist, Anatoly Ivanov. Later he attended the Art Students League of New York as well as furthering his studies with the contemporary Impressionist artist, Ovanes Berberian. Among his art instructors, Ivanov influenced Pejman the most by inspiring him to use the techniques of old masters such as Michelangelo and Raphael. Employing these techniques, Pejman blends them with impressionistic colors to achieve a classical but yet contemporary style.

== Artistic style and influences ==
Pejman's style from the late 1980s onward can be characterized as Romantic Realism or Neo Romantic Realism, which is a style based on Classical Realism. As described by Sarah Seamark, senior editor of Art World News in an article on Bob Pejman that was published in the November 2004 issue, "Inspiration for his style, that likens to romantic realism, comes from the Hudson River School, the classic landscapes of Thomas Cole and Frederic Church, the utopias of Maxfield Parrish, and above all, from the Victorian artist Lawrence Alma-Tadema, known for his theatrical paintings of Roman ruins. While the influence of these masters is evident in Pejman's works, it is through his unique arrangement and depiction of the subject matters that he achieves a distinctive style. It is the effect of beauty and solitude together that creates this romantic mood that Pejman wishes to offer collectors of his work."

Pejman's style has been likened to theatrical set designs by many art critics. This design element together with his combination of classical painting style and use of contemporary colors make Pejman's works notable in the school of Classical Realism. Art critic Eileen Watkins, in her review of a Pejman exhibition in The Newark Star Ledger that was published on October 27, 1995, stated, "Many of these works resemble theatrical sets, with the nearer elements framing dramatic vistas." In describing one of Pejman's works, she goes on to say, "'Spring Time in Persepolis' features a ruined temple, its gray stone columns and walls carved with animals and soldiers. A slab in the foreground, however, displays spring flowers in a cracked vase, lush, dewy fruit and a colorful bird — the meticulous details suggest a 17th Century Dutch still life, but without the gloomy lighting." In a review and interview published in the March 1997 issue of Heritage Magazine, art critic and contributing writer Anna Ahkami describes Bob Pejman's style as, "Blending realism, impressionism and fantasy, Bob Pejman's paintings offer a modern look at the ancient ruins of the Mediterranean and Middle East. Fragments of stone temples, majestic villas and overgrown gardens, some of which no longer exist, are painted in direct, clear-cut detail. Pejman relies upon his vivid imagination to rebuild these relics showing the impact centuries of wind, nature and man's own destruction have had upon them. Using bright, contemporary luminescent colors viewers are welcomed into such lush yet forgotten places as Persepolis, Babylon and Pompeii."

== National publication reviews and articles ==
- Art World News, May 2004, article by Sarah Seamark (senior editor)
- Art Business News, April 2002 article by Audrey S. Chapman
- The Artist's Magazine, July 1998 article by Debbie Hagan
- Newark Star Ledger, October 27, 1995 review of one-man exhibition by Eileen Watkins (art critic)

== Copyrighted and published pieces listed in order of year publication in the United States ==
Bright Lights, Big City (2014), Cinque Terre Sunset (2014), Venetian Sunset (2013), Santa Maria Sunset (2013), Day's End in Venice (2012), Sebonack (2011), Eternal Lake Como (2010), Garden Terrace in Amalfi (2009), Mission Reflections (2009), Laguna Beach Stroll (2009), Springtime in New York (2007), Morning Reflections (2006), Lakeside Vineyard (2006), The Niche in Tuscany (2006), Varenna Reflections (2005), Santorini Villa (2004), Bellagio Village (2003), Passage to San Marco (2002), Lake Como Villa (2001), Bellagio Memories (2000), Rendezvous in Venice (1999), Afternoon in Venice (1998), Terrace in Bellagio (1997), Tuscany Window I & II (1997), Tuscany Village (1997), Green Door in Capri (1997), Capri Terrace (1997), Villa in Capri (1996), Apollo & Daphne (1995), Afternoon Tea at Vizcaya (1994), Solitude (1995)
