= Richard S. Sutton =

Computer scientist

Richard Sutton FRS FRSC
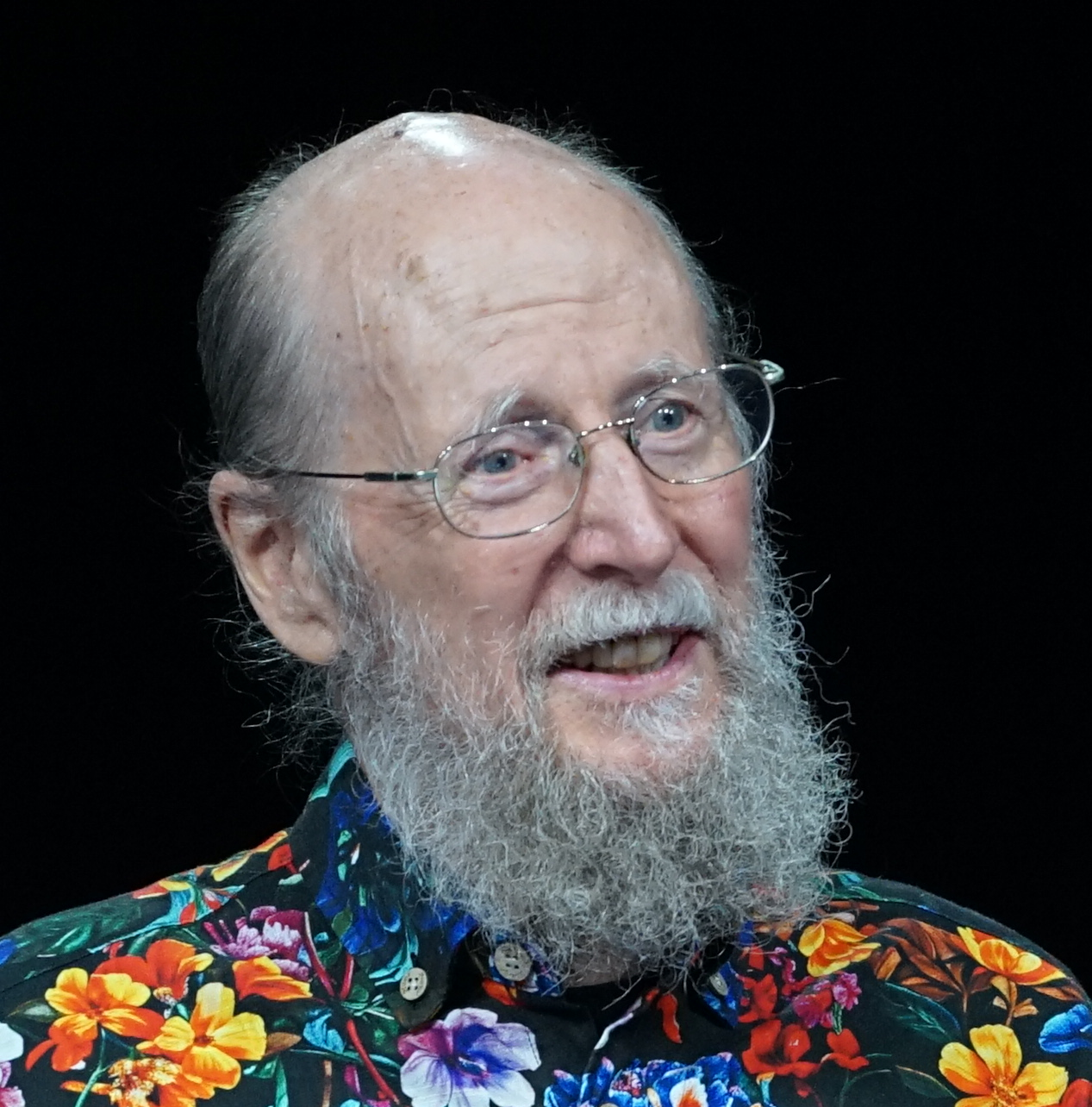
- Sutton at NeurIPS 2025
- Born: Richard Stuart Sutton; 1957 or 1958 (age 68–69); Toledo, Ohio, U.S.
- Citizenship: Canada since 2015, USA until 2017
- Education: Stanford University (BA); University of Massachusetts, Amherst (MS, PhD)
- Known for: Temporal difference learning The Bitter Lesson
- Awards: AAAI Fellow (2001); Turing Award (2024); IEEE Frank Rosenblatt Award (2026)
- Scientific career
- Fields: Artificial intelligence; Reinforcement learning; Machine learning; Cognitive science; Computer science
- Workplaces: University of Alberta; AT&T Labs; Google DeepMind; GTE; University of Massachusetts Amherst
- Thesis: Temporal credit assignment in reinforcement learning (1984)
- Doctoral advisor: Andrew Barto
- Doctoral students: David Silver; Doina Precup
- Website: richsutton.com

Richard Stuart Sutton FRS FRSC (born 1957 or 1958) is an American-Canadian computer scientist. He is a professor of computing science at the University of Alberta and chief scientific advisor at the Alberta Machine Intelligence Institute. In 2024, Sutton received the Turing Award alongside his supervisor Andrew Barto for their work in reinforcement learning.

Sutton is considered one of the founders of modern computational reinforcement learning, known for his contributions to temporal difference learning and policy gradient methods. He proposed the "bitter lesson", an influential observation about AI scaling limits. He is on the scientific advisory committee of the Schwartz Reisman Institute for Technology and Society.

== Early life and education ==
Richard Sutton was born in either 1957 or 1958 in Toledo, Ohio, and grew up in Oak Brook, Illinois, a suburb of Chicago, United States.

Sutton received his Bachelor of Arts (BA) degree in psychology from Stanford University in 1978 before taking a Master of Science (1980) and PhD (1984) in computer science from the University of Massachusetts Amherst supervised by Andrew Barto. His doctoral dissertation introduced actor-critic architectures and temporal credit assignment.

He was influenced by Harry Klopf's work in the 1970s, which proposed that supervised learning is insufficient for AI or explaining intelligent behavior, and trial-and-error learning, driven by "hedonic aspects of behavior", is necessary. This focused his interest to reinforcement learning.

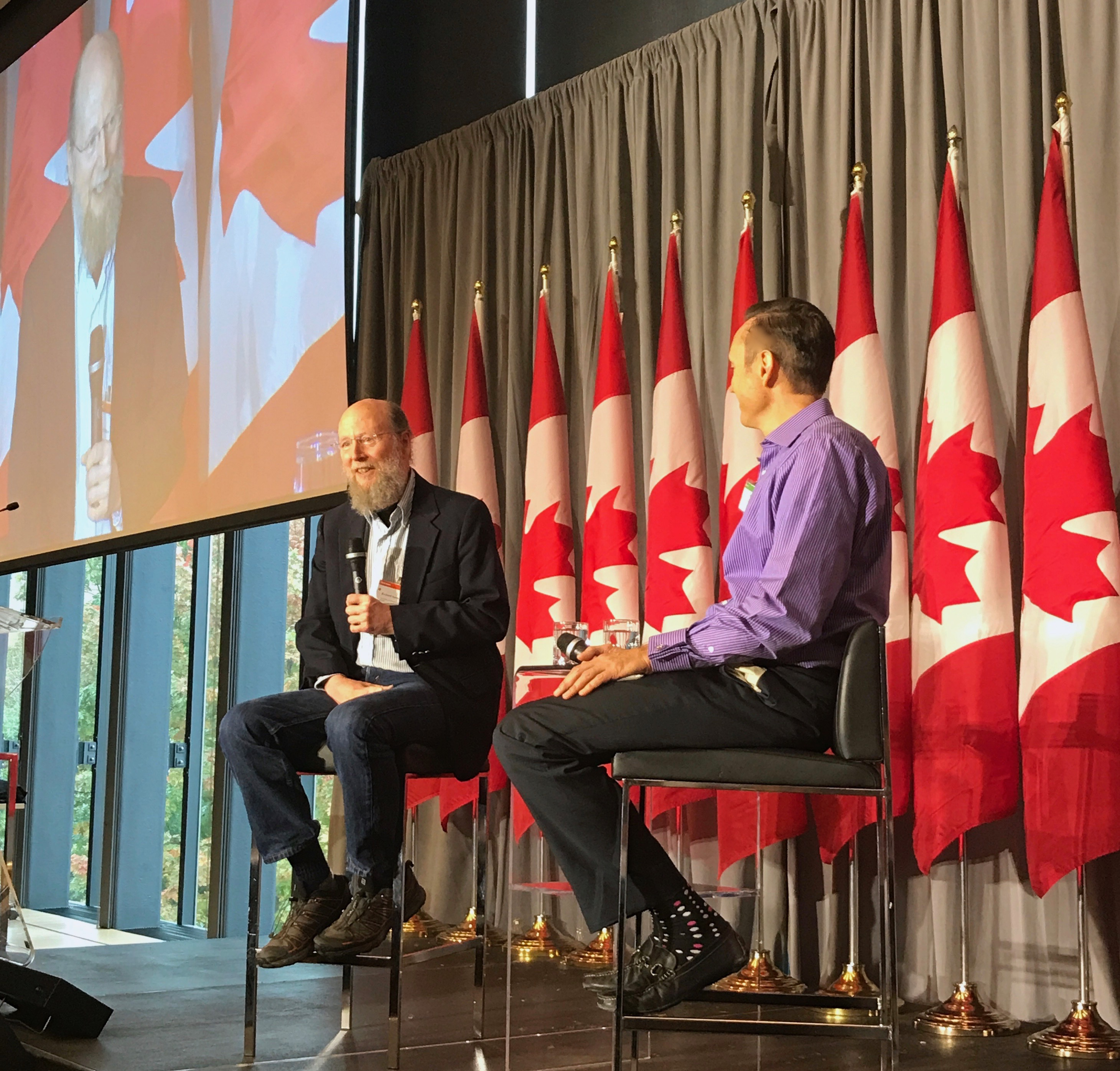
Sutton interviewed by Steve Jurvetson on AlphaGo in 2017

== Career and research ==
Sutton held a postdoctoral research position at the University of Massachusetts Amherst in 1984. He worked at GTE Laboratories in Waltham, Massachusetts as principal member of technical staff from 1985 to 1994, then returned to the University of Massachusetts Amherst as a senior research scientist. He joined AT&T Labs Shannon Laboratory in Florham Park, New Jersey as principal technical staff member from 1998 to 2002. He has been a professor of computing science at the University of Alberta since 2003, where he helped establish the Reinforcement Learning and Artificial Intelligence Laboratory.

From 2017 to 2023, he worked at Google DeepMind as a distinguished research scientist. He helped launch DeepMind Alberta in Edmonton, a research office operated in close collaboration with the University of Alberta. Following that, he joined Keen Technologies, John Carmack's AI research company. In 2026, he left Keen Technologies alongside Khurram Javed to launch Oak Lab, an AI startup aiming to develop AI agents that can continually learn from their environment through reinforcement learning.

=== Reinforcement learning ===
Sutton joined Andrew Barto in the early 1980s at UMass, trying to explore the behavior of neurons in the human brain as the basis for human intelligence, a concept that had been advanced by computer scientist A. Harry Klopf. Sutton and Barto used mathematics toward furthering the concept and using it as the basis for artificial intelligence. This concept became known as reinforcement learning and went on to becoming a key part of artificial intelligence techniques.

Barto and Sutton used Markov decision processes (MDP) as the mathematical foundation to explain how agents (algorithmic entities) made decisions when in a stochastic or random environment, receiving rewards at the end of every action. Traditional MDP theory assumed the agents knew all information about the MDPs in their attempt toward maximizing their cumulative rewards. Barto and Sutton's reinforcement learning techniques allowed for both the environment and the rewards to be unknown, and thus allowed for these category of algorithms to be applied to a wide array of problems.

Sutton moved to Canada in the 2000s, beginning his professorship at the University of Alberta, and continued working on the topic which continued to develop in academic circles until one of its first major real world applications saw Google's AlphaGo program built on this concept defeating the then prevailing human champion. Barto and Sutton have widely been credited and accepted as pioneers of modern reinforcement learning, with the technique itself being foundational to the AI boom.

In a 2019 essay, Sutton proposed the "bitter lesson", which criticized the field of AI research for failing to learn that "building in how we think we think does not work in the long run", arguing that "70 years of AI research [had shown] that general methods that leverage computation are ultimately the most effective, and by a large margin", beating efforts building on human knowledge about specific fields like computer vision, speech recognition, chess or Go.

Sutton argues that large language models aren’t capable of learning on-the-job, and so new model architectures are required to enable continual learning. Sutton further argues that a special training phase will be unnecessary — the agent will learn on-the-fly, rendering large language models obsolete.

In 2023, Sutton and John Carmack announced a partnership for the development of artificial general intelligence (AGI).

=== Awards and honors ===
Sutton has been a fellow of the Association for the Advancement of Artificial Intelligence (AAAI) since 2001; his nomination read: "For significant contributions to many topics in machine learning, including reinforcement learning, temporal difference techniques, and neural networks." In 2003, he received the President's Award from the International Neural Network Society and in 2013, the Outstanding Achievement in Research award from the University of Massachusetts Amherst. In 2021, he was appointed Canada CIFAR AI Chair and received the IJCAI Award for Research Excellence. He received the 2024 Turing Award from the Association for Computing Machinery together with Andrew Barto; the citation of the award read: "For developing the conceptual and algorithmic foundations of reinforcement learning."

In 2016, Sutton was elected Fellow of the Royal Society of Canada. In 2021, he was elected Fellow of the Royal Society (FRS) of London.

In 2026, together with Andrew Barto, Sutton received the IEEE Frank Rosenblatt Award, "For contributions to reinforcement learning and artificial intelligence".

=== Research ===
Sutton introduced temporal-difference methods for prediction and control, establishing convergence properties and practical algorithms. He proposed integrated learning and planning through the Dyna architecture. He co-developed the options framework for temporal abstraction in reinforcement learning. He co-authored the first modern policy gradient formulation with function approximation.

Sutton's essay The Bitter Lesson argued that general methods that scale with computation dominate domain-specific approaches in the long run.

His former doctoral students include David Silver and Doina Precup.

=== Selected publications ===
His publications include:

Year	Title	Venue or publisher	Notes
1988	Learning to predict by the methods of temporal differences	Machine Learning 3, 9-44	TD learning foundations
1990	Neural Networks for Control	MIT Press	co-editor with W. T. Miller III and P. J. Werbos
1991	Dyna, an integrated architecture for learning, planning, and reacting	ACM SIGART Bulletin	Early Dyna results
1998	Reinforcement Learning: An Introduction	MIT Press	with Andrew G. Barto. First edition
1999	Between MDPs and semi-MDPs, a framework for temporal abstraction in RL	Artificial Intelligence 112, 181-211	Options framework with Doina Precup and Satinder Singh
2000	Policy Gradient Methods for Reinforcement Learning with Function Approximation	NeurIPS 12	Policy gradient theorem with function approximation
2010	GQ(lambda), a general gradient algorithm for temporal-difference prediction learning with eligibility traces	technical report, University of Alberta	off-policy TD with gradients, with H. R. Maei
2018	Reinforcement Learning, An Introduction	MIT Press	with Andrew G. Barto. Second edition
2025	Welcome to the Era of Experience	Google AI	with David Silver.

== Personal life ==
Sutton became a Canadian citizen in 2015, and his renunciation of US citizenship was reported in 2017.
