= Shojaat Ghane =

Iranian chess grandmaster (born 1975)

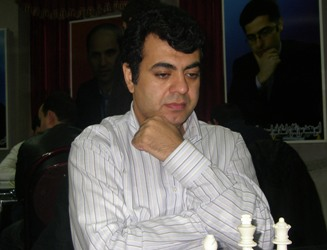

Personal information
- Born: 30 March 1975 (age 51) Tehran, Iran

Chess career
- Country: Iran
- Title: Grandmaster (2008)
- Peak rating: 2507 (October 2007)

Shojaat Ghane (Persian: شجاعت قانع; born 1975) is an Iranian chess grandmaster (2008).

== Life ==
Ghane started playing chess when he was 16. He is a student of physical education.
