= Barbara J. Grosz =

American computer scientist (born 1948)

Barbara Grosz
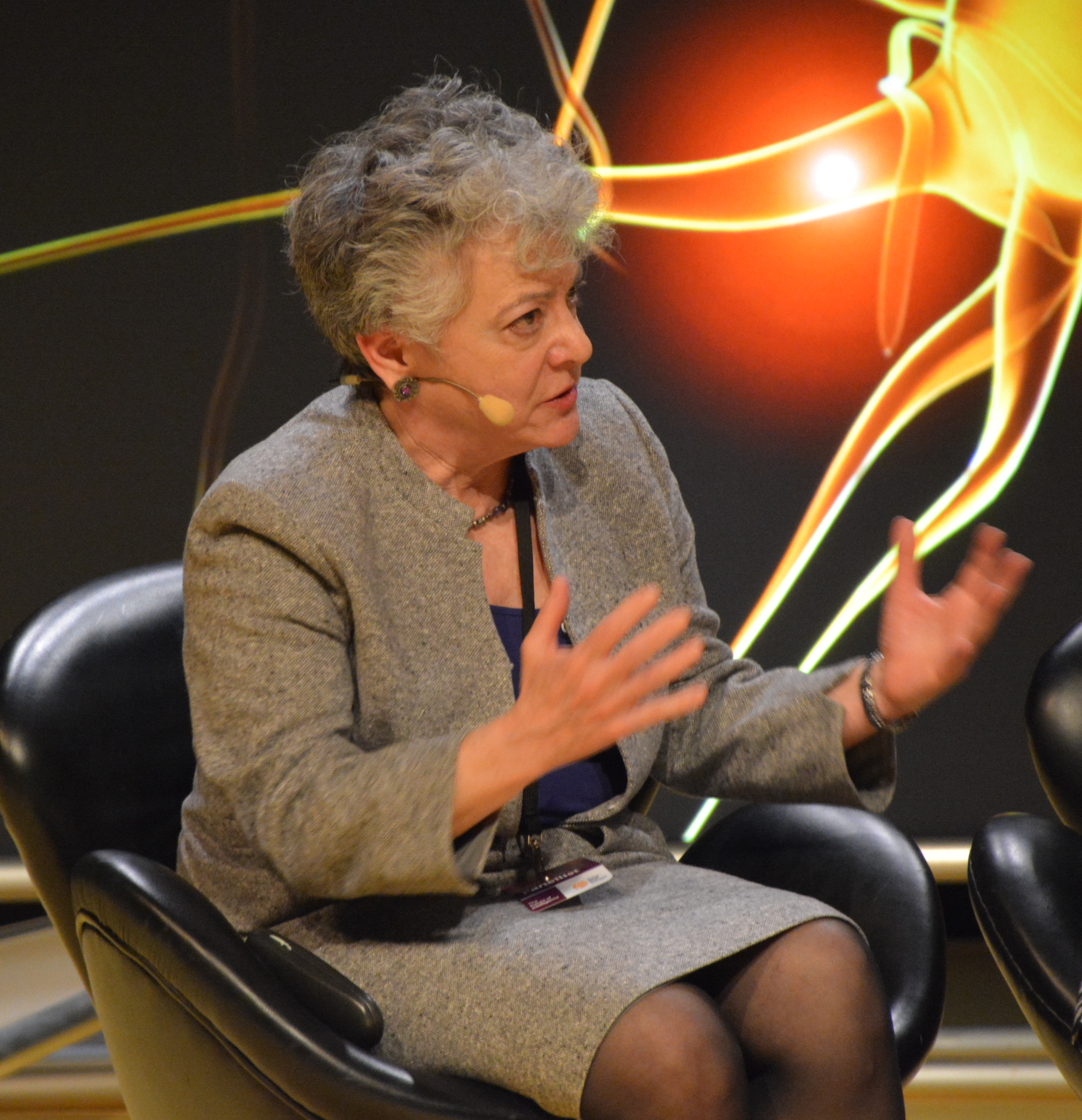
- Born: Barbara Jean Grosz; July 21, 1948; Philadelphia, Pennsylvania, U.S.
- Education: University of California, Berkeley; Cornell University
- Awards: AAAI Fellow (1990); ACM Fellow (2004); ACM/AAAI Allen Newell Award (2008); CorrFRSE (2014); IJCAI Award for Research Excellence (2015) ACL Lifetime Achievement Award (2017)
- Scientific career
- Fields: Artificial Intelligence; Natural language processing; Multi-agent systems
- Workplaces: Harvard University
- Thesis: The Representation and Use of Focus in Dialogue Understanding (1977)
- Doctoral advisor: Martin H. Graham
- Doctoral students: Martha E. Pollack
- Other notable students: Steven Salzberg

Barbara J. Grosz CorrFRSE (Philadelphia, July 21, 1948) is an American computer scientist and Higgins Professor of Natural Sciences at Harvard University. She has made seminal contributions to the fields of natural language processing and multi-agent systems. With Alison Simmons, she is co-founder of the Embedded EthiCS programme at Harvard, which embeds ethics lessons into computer science courses.

Grosz was elected a member of the National Academy of Engineering in 2008 for pioneering research in natural language communication between humans and computers and its application to human-computer interaction.

== Education ==
Grosz earned a bachelor's degree in mathematics from Cornell University in 1969, and master's and doctoral degrees in computer science from the University of California at Berkeley in 1971 and 1977, respectively.

== Career ==
Grosz established and led interdisciplinary institutions, and advanced the role of women in science. From 2007 to 2011 Grosz served as interim dean and then dean of Harvard's Radcliffe Institute for Advanced Study, and from 2001 to 2007 she was the Institute's first dean of science, designing and building its science program. She currently serves on the Science Board and Science Steering Committee at the Santa Fe Institute. She is responsible for Harvard being one of the first universities to integrate philosophy across different computer science courses. In 2019, Grosz co-authored "Embedded EthiCS: Integrating Ethics Across CS Education," emphasizing the importance of embedding ethical reasoning into computer science curricula.

=== Memberships and awards ===
Grosz is a member of the American Philosophical Society (2003), the American Academy of Arts and Sciences (2004), and the National Academy of Engineering (2008). She is a fellow of the Association for the Advancement of Artificial Intelligence (AAAI) (1990), the American Association for the Advancement of Science (1990), and the Association for Computing Machinery (ACM) (2004).

In 1993, she became the first woman president of the AAAI. She serves on the executive committee and is a former trustee of the International Joint Conferences on Artificial Intelligence and serves on the council of the American Philosophical Society. In 2008, she received the ACM/AAAI Allen Newell Award for "fundamental contributions to research in natural language processing and in multi-agent systems, for her leadership in the field of artificial intelligence, and for her role in the establishment and leadership of interdisciplinary institutions". In 2014 she was elected a Corresponding Fellow of the Royal Society of Edinburgh. In 2015, she received the IJCAI Award for Research Excellence for her pioneering research in Natural Language Processing and in theories and applications of Multiagent Collaboration. In 2017, she received the Association for Computational Linguistics Life Time Achievement Award.

== Research ==
Grosz specializes in natural language processing and multi-agent systems. She developed some of the earliest computer dialogue systems and established the research field of computational modeling of discourse.

Her work on models of collaboration helped establish that field and provides the framework for several collaborative multi-agent and human-computer interface systems. Grosz has developed a theory of discourse structure that specifies how discourse interpretation depends on interactions among speaker intentions, attentional state, and linguistic form. She has been using the theory to study the use of intonation to convey information about discourse structure, for instance how tones demark, in spoken language, some of the structure that paragraphs and parentheses indicate in written language.

=== Books ===
Grosz contributed one chapter to the 2018 book Architects of Intelligence: The Truth About AI from the People Building it by the American futurist Martin Ford. She chaired the National Academies of Sciences, Engineering, and Medicine committee that produced the 2022 report Fostering Responsible Computing Research: Foundations and Practices.

Preceded by Joan Bresnan	ACL Lifetime Achievement Award; 2017	Succeeded by -
