= Peyman Ghane =

Iranian scenic designer

Peyman Ghane (Persian: پیمان قانع)
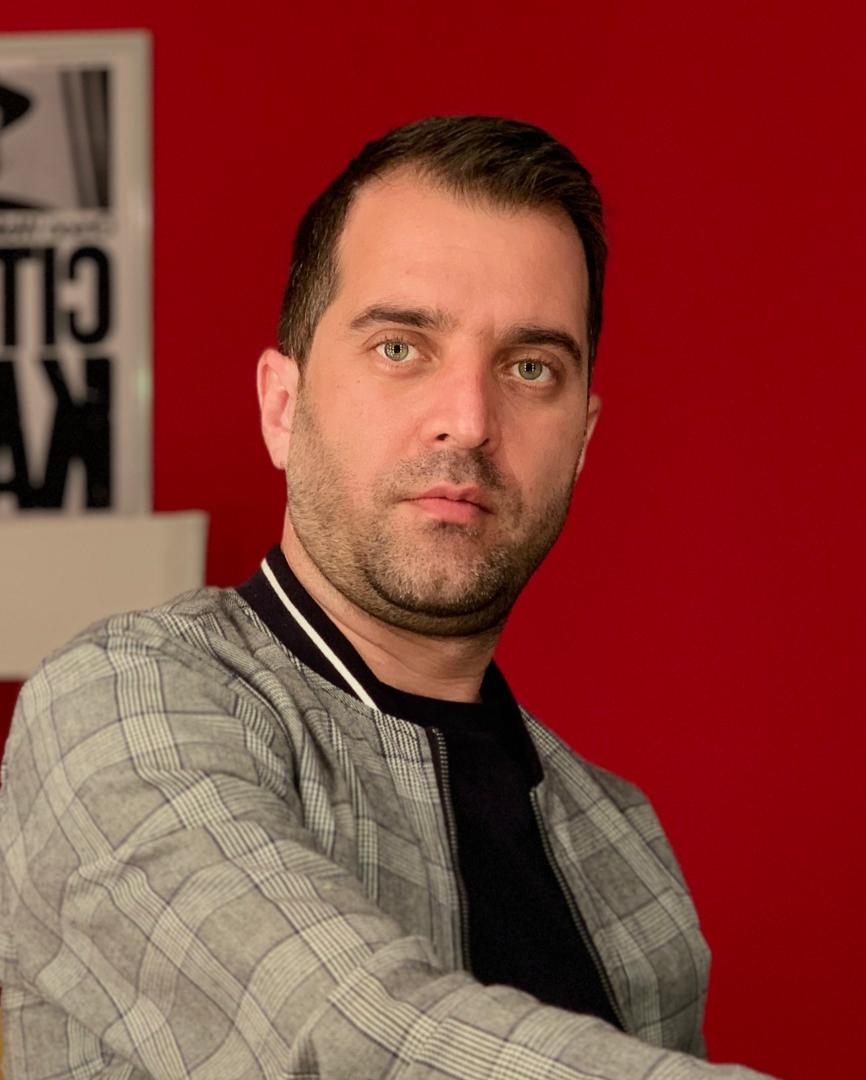
- Born: June 23, 1980 (age 45); Mashhad, Iran
- Occupation: Scenic designer

Peyman Ghane (born June 23, 1980) is an Iranian scenic designer and decorator of some popular television shows on IRIB. He was awarded the best design award for the scenic design of Koodak Show at the fourth and fifth Jam-e-Jam Television Festival.

== Works ==
- Dorehami
- Mah-e Asal
- Khandevane
- The Monster
- Koodak Show
- Dast Farmoon (Steering Skills)
- Sime Akhar
- Iranish
- Mesle Maah (Like Moon)
- Tab Taab
- Haft (Seven)
- Khat-e Sevvom (The Third Line)
- Dastkhat (Handwriting)
- Se Setareh (Three Stars)
