= Elyasin community =

Elyasin Community (Persian: جمعیت ال یاسین also known as Ale Yasin or Elahyoun) is an Iranian spiritual cultural community founded by Peyman Fattahi in 1991. The community is a coalition of individuals, non-governmental organizations (NGOs), magazines and publishing houses which aims to raise public awareness in the field of spiritual and applied matters. Elyasin has been working in a range of activities since the 1990s; holding lectures and public speeches of its founder (Peyman Fattahi, also known as Master Elias M. Ramollah), publishing books and magazines, research, and training its members on thinking and writing methods, as well as holding workshops. According to the latest published news (in 2009) the Elyasin community has around 200,000 members.

Elyasin Community members believe in and emphasize the reconciliation of religions and faiths as well as Union of the Civilizations, which has caused them to be persecuted by the Iranian Government since 2007.

== History of activities and affiliated institutions ==
The Elyasin Community was founded by Peyman Fattahi in early 1991. Its activities have been based on spiritualism ever since. There are several publishing houses, magazines and cultural institutions affiliated to the Elyasin Community.

Magazines: Arts of Living, Esoteric Knowledge, Motivators, Science of Success, Art of Transcendental Life, and Sublime Thinking.

Institutions: Avamer-e-Yasin, Science of Success, Association of Free Thinkers and Researchers, Nature Front Association, Yasin Society of Writers and Researchers (Payam), Professional Management Research Group, Elyasin Human Rights and International Affairs.

Publishing houses: Divine Guidance (Taalime Hagh), Haa-Mim, Ya-hou and Vassama.

== Persecution by Iranian Government ==
Since established, the Elyasin Community has been working independently of any political party and its activities are mainly focused on research and studying cultural-spiritual subjects. After the first detention of Peyman Fattahi by the Ministry of Intelligence and National Security of Iran in June 2007, most of the institutions and NGOs were closed down and their authorities and members prosecuted or detained in charge of propaganda against the Islamic Government of Iran. This occurred during Ahmadinejad’s presidency and restrictions are still ongoing.

Regarding the conflicts of Iranian Government against Elyasin Community, the website of Radio Zamaneh wrote:

During the past 30 years, such prosecutions have been spread to non-religious minorities due to the theocratic feature of Iranian Regime. Serial assassination of scholars of Association of Writers, security activities of Saeed Emami’s Sect and Shariatmadari's gangs against intellectuals, production and broadcasting of the 'Hovyiat' TV series, television confessions, and formation of various suppressive organizations such as 'Ershad' and 'Forbidding what is Evil' are examples of such Cultural Talibanic Policy in Iran. Elyasin Community has been one of the most recent victims of the 'policy of persecution of dissident minorities' in Iran. After taking power, the Mahdist (Messianic) Shiite Sect has spent large sum of money to spread superstitious beliefs throughout the Iranian society, i.e. the budget for Jamkaran Well, and claiming to manage the country by Imam Mahdi's guidance, but, yet they insist to call the dissidents as 'sect'. The security-cultural system of Iranian government is trying to accuse Elyasin Community of religious innovation and assigning them to 19th century religious movements in Iran.

In spring 2009, simultaneous to the Iran presidential election, nearly 200 members and representative of Elyasin went on a hunger strike at Ayatollah Khomeini’s tomb as a protest against detention of their leader (Peyman Fattahi) and prosecution of other members of the community.

The leader of Elyasin Community (Peyman Fattahi) has been detained in 2007, 2009, 2011 and 2012, spending a total of 400 days in solitary confinement in the 209 ward of Evin Prison.
