= Peyman Fattahi =

Iranian spiritual leader

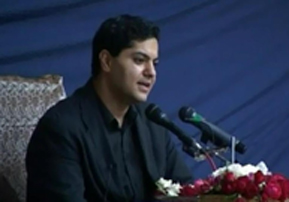
Peyman Fattahi (Master Elias M. Ramollah), founder and leader of Elyasin community

Peyman Fattahi (Persian: پیمان فتاحی, born 1973), also known as Master Elias M. Ramollah (استاد ایلیا میم), is the founder and leader of the El Yasin Community (جمیعت آل یاسین). Born in Kermanshah, Iran, he embarked on his journey of public instruction at the age of 23. His teachings encompass a diverse array of subjects, spanning spirituality, cognitive processes, methods of thinking, parapsychology, metaphysics and esoteric knowledge. he imparts profound concepts, notably including "Systematic Decision Making using the 7/10 Method" and the "Poly-What Planning Formula."

He has consistently emphasized that he does not align himself with any particular religion and does not consider himself to be a religious man, despite a substantial portion of his teachings centering on the reinvigoration of divine spiritualism, esoteric cognition, and self-awareness. Despite possessing limited formal academic education, he has authored an extensive body of work exceeding 4,000 pages in the realm of esoteric knowledge, encompassing both applied and foundational theories. Furthermore, he has provided oversight and guidance for over 200 research projects, and the content of his public addresses has been meticulously curated, resulting in the creation of more than 39 books. Fattahi ascribes his knowledge to his observations, thoughts and personal attributes.

While his teachings in the fields of cognitive processes and methods of thinking have gained significant popularity in the last 15 years, some of his followers still view him as a spiritual leader. Fattahi presents himself as a devoted servant of God and often refers to himself as an ordinary person. He attributes all extraordinary phenomena to the Spirit of God, whom he considers to be his protector and guide.

Fattahi encapsulates the core of his teachings in the profound statement, 'There is no deity but God' (La Elaha Ella Hou), and he perceives the instruction and realization of this declaration as his life's calling. He places a strong emphasis on fostering unity and reconciliation among religions, nations, and diverse ideologies. He expounds upon the imperative and actualization of a global revolution to prepare the world for what he terms 'the Divine Manifestation and a momentous evolution.'"

== Teachings ==
Fattahi asserts that he commenced his teachings at the age of 16, initially among a limited group of students. By the age of 23, he had embarked on public speaking engagements. Fattahi's supporters maintain that over the past two decades, he has proposed a multitude of doctrines and foundational theories.

Fattahi's teachings are rooted in "Elahism." An alternative term for his teachings is "The Art of Transcendental Life," which comprises two distinct levels. The first level encompasses straightforward, general instructions and is referred to as the "Solar Level" or the stage of "Revival and Rebirth." At the core of these instructions lies the perception of divine presence and the revelation of love for The Lord often described as "living lovingly in the divine presence," all of which are underpinned by specific principles."

The second level, known as the "Astronomical Level," alternatively referred to as "ZX methods" or "Psychotechnology," encompasses advanced concepts, including "creative dreaming," "spiritual communication," "teletransportation," "energy hunting," and "parallel experiencing." Fattahi reserves this advanced training exclusively for a select group of his followers. These individuals willingly commit to stringent rules, which encompass maintaining anonymity, practicing secrecy, refraining from utilizing their abilities for personal gain, and adhering to certain unconventional conditions."

Elia does not charge attendees for his teachings; instead, their commitment and dedication serve as the currency for their training.

=== Other public teachings ===
Alongside his spiritual and cognitive teachings, Fattahi has conducted guidance for a select group of his students, providing specialized training. Fattahi imparts what he terms as "XZY" or "36 Methods of Sublime Thinking", which delve into various techniques for fostering advanced cognitive processes and informed decision-making.

== Criticism ==
In a 2004 article published by Kayhan newspaper (regarded as "one of the most conservative Iranian newspaper" and an official publication of Islamic Republic of Iran), Fattahi was first mentioned as a controversial figure and characterized as a 'perverted character' within the publication. His name reemerged once more in both Kayhan and Resalat newspapers a few months prior to his initial detention by the Ministry of Intelligence and Security.

Some critics have levied allegations of heresy and prophetic claims against Fattahi, characterizing his teachings as constituting a New Religious Movement (NRM). Conversely, others regard him as the leader of a controversial and subversive sect associated with the global Zionist networks and the Masons. In addition, he has also been labeled as a mesmerizer, wizard, neo-Rasputin and an advocate of Kabbala.

In 2010, an article titled 'A God who is the 13th child of his family' was published in Jomhouri Eslami, portraying him as an individual who has asserted himself as a deity.

In 2006, The 6th branch of the Special Court for Governmental Staffs was granted authorization to initiate a special case against him. This Development was announced publicly by Kayhan, urging potential plaintiffs to come forward and lodge their complaints. However, the case ultimately concluded without yielding any specific results, as it lacked any plaintiffs.

== Detentions ==
=== First detention ===
On 27 May, 2007, Fattahi was initially detained under the authority of the Office of Religions and Sects (اداره ادیان و فرق) within the Ministry of Intelligence and National Security of Iran. He faced a range of charges, including religious innovation, promoting religious pluralism, apostasy, conspiracy against the Islamic regime, and acting against national security. Notably, several of his close adherents and followers, including two of his brothers, Keyvan and Ramin Fattahi, were also arrested. Ramin Fattahi was held in confinement for 45 days before being released, and he subsequently died due to kidney dysfunction. Later on, Fattahi wrote a letter to the Supreme Leader of Iran, Ali Khamenei, in which he described being subjected to torture. However, This letter led to Fattahi being summoned and subjected to assault and physical abuse by his interrogators, ultimately resulting in his hospitalization.

In November 2007, Fattahi was released on bail amounting to 300 million Tomans, equivalent to nearly US$300,000, after enduring six months of imprisonment. His time in detention was marked by recurring nose and ear bleeds, bloody vomiting, and bloody urination.

=== Second detention ===
In mid-January 2009, Fattahi was once again detained, this time with five of his close students, and subsequently placed in solitary confinement within the political 209 ward of Evin Prison.

=== Third detention ===
On 24 July 2011, a report was surfaced regarding Fattahi's third detention, which also involved several of his students and members of the Association of Thinkers and Researchers. A few days later, the official spokesperson of the Elyasin Community, residing in the UK, confirmed the incident but emphasized that all individuals had been released shortly after their detention, with no one remaining in custody. This assertion was corroborated by other members as well. Subsequent to this confirmation, Tabnak and various other government-affiliated blogs and websites issued statements, presenting the government's perspective on Fattahi's arrest.

== Written works and confiscated books ==
More than 30 of Fattahi's books have been confiscated by the Ministry of Intelligence and National Security of Iran. This ongoing series of confiscations underscore the existence of an ongoing dispute, implying that the government has maintained a persistent and contentious stance toward Fattahi and his ideological principles.
