= History of natural language processing =

The history of natural language processing describes the advancements of natural language processing. There is some overlap with the history of machine translation, the history of speech recognition, and the history of artificial intelligence.

== Early history ==
The history of machine translation dates back to the seventeenth century, when philosophers such as Leibniz and Descartes put forward proposals for codes which would relate words between languages. All of these proposals remained theoretical, and none resulted in the development of an actual solution.

The first patents for "translating machines" were applied for in the mid-1930s. One proposal, by Georges Artsrouni, was simply an automatic bilingual dictionary using paper tape. The other proposal, by Peter Troyanskii, a Russian, was more detailed. Troyanskii’s proposal included both the bilingual dictionary and a method for dealing with grammatical roles between languages, based on Esperanto.

== Logical period ==
In 1950, Alan Turing published his famous article "Computing Machinery and Intelligence" which proposed what is now called the Turing test as a criterion of intelligence. This criterion depends on the ability of a computer program to impersonate a human in a real-time written conversation with a human judge, sufficiently well that the judge is unable to distinguish reliably — on the basis of the conversational content alone — between the program and a real human.

In 1957, Noam Chomsky’s Syntactic Structures revolutionized Linguistics with 'universal grammar', a rule-based system of syntactic structures.

The Georgetown experiment in 1954 involved fully automatic translation of more than sixty Russian sentences into English. The authors claimed that within three or five years, machine translation would be a solved problem. However, real progress was much slower, and after the ALPAC report in 1966, which found that ten years long research had failed to fulfill the expectations, funding for machine translation was dramatically reduced. Little further research in machine translation was conducted until the late 1980s, when the first statistical machine translation systems were developed.

Some notably successful NLP systems developed in the 1960s were SHRDLU, a natural language system working in restricted "blocks worlds" with restricted vocabularies.

In 1969, Roger Schank introduced the conceptual dependency theory for natural language understanding. This model, partially influenced by the work of Sydney Lamb, was extensively used by Schank's students at Yale University, such as Robert Wilensky, Wendy Lehnert, and Janet Kolodner.

In 1970, William A. Woods introduced the augmented transition network (ATN) to represent natural language input. Instead of phrase structure rules ATNs used an equivalent set of finite-state automata that were called recursively. ATNs and their more general format called "generalized ATNs" continued to be used for a number of years. During the 1970s many programmers began to write 'conceptual ontologies', which structured real-world information into computer-understandable data. Examples are MARGIE (Schank, 1975), SAM (Cullingford, 1978), PAM (Wilensky, 1978), TaleSpin (Meehan, 1976), QUALM (Lehnert, 1977), Politics (Carbonell, 1979), and Plot Units (Lehnert 1981). During this time, many chatterbots were written including PARRY, Racter, and Jabberwacky.

== Statistical period ==
An important precursor to the statistical turn was the work of Frederick Jelinek and his colleagues at IBM Research. Beginning in 1972, Jelinek led research that applied information-theoretic and probabilistic methods to speech recognition and language modeling, helping re-establish statistical approaches in speech and language processing.

Throughout much of the 1980s, rule-based approaches remained dominant in NLP. Starting in the late 1980s, however, there was a revolution in NLP with the introduction of machine learning algorithms for language processing. This was due both to the steady increase in computational power resulting from Moore's law and the gradual lessening of the dominance of Chomskyan theories of linguistics (e.g. transformational grammar), whose theoretical underpinnings discouraged the sort of corpus linguistics that underlies the machine-learning approach to language processing. Some of the earliest-used machine learning algorithms, such as decision trees, produced systems of hard if-then rules similar to existing hand-written rules. Increasingly, however, research has focused on statistical models, which make soft, probabilistic decisions based on attaching real-valued weights to the features making up the input data. The cache language models upon which many speech recognition systems now rely are examples of such statistical models. Such models are generally more robust when given unfamiliar input, especially input that contains errors (as is very common for real-world data), and produce more reliable results when integrated into a larger system comprising multiple subtasks.

=== Datasets ===
The emergence of statistical approaches was aided by both increase in computing power and the availability of large datasets. At that time, large multilingual corpora were starting to emerge. Notably, some were produced by the Parliament of Canada and the European Union as a result of laws calling for the translation of all governmental proceedings into all official languages of the corresponding systems of government.

Many of the notable early successes occurred in the field of machine translation. In 1993, the IBM alignment models were used for statistical machine translation. Compared to previous machine translation systems, which were symbolic systems manually coded by computational linguists, these systems were statistical, which allowed them to automatically learn from large textual corpora. Though these systems do not work well in situations where only small corpora is available, so data-efficient methods continue to be an area of research and development.

In 2001, a one-billion-word large text corpus, scraped from the Internet, referred to as "very very large" at the time, was used for word disambiguation.

To take advantage of large, unlabelled datasets, algorithms were developed for unsupervised and self-supervised learning. Generally, this task is much more difficult than supervised learning, and typically produces less accurate results for a given amount of input data. However, there is an enormous amount of non-annotated data available (including, among other things, the entire content of the World Wide Web), which can often make up for the inferior results.

== Neural period ==
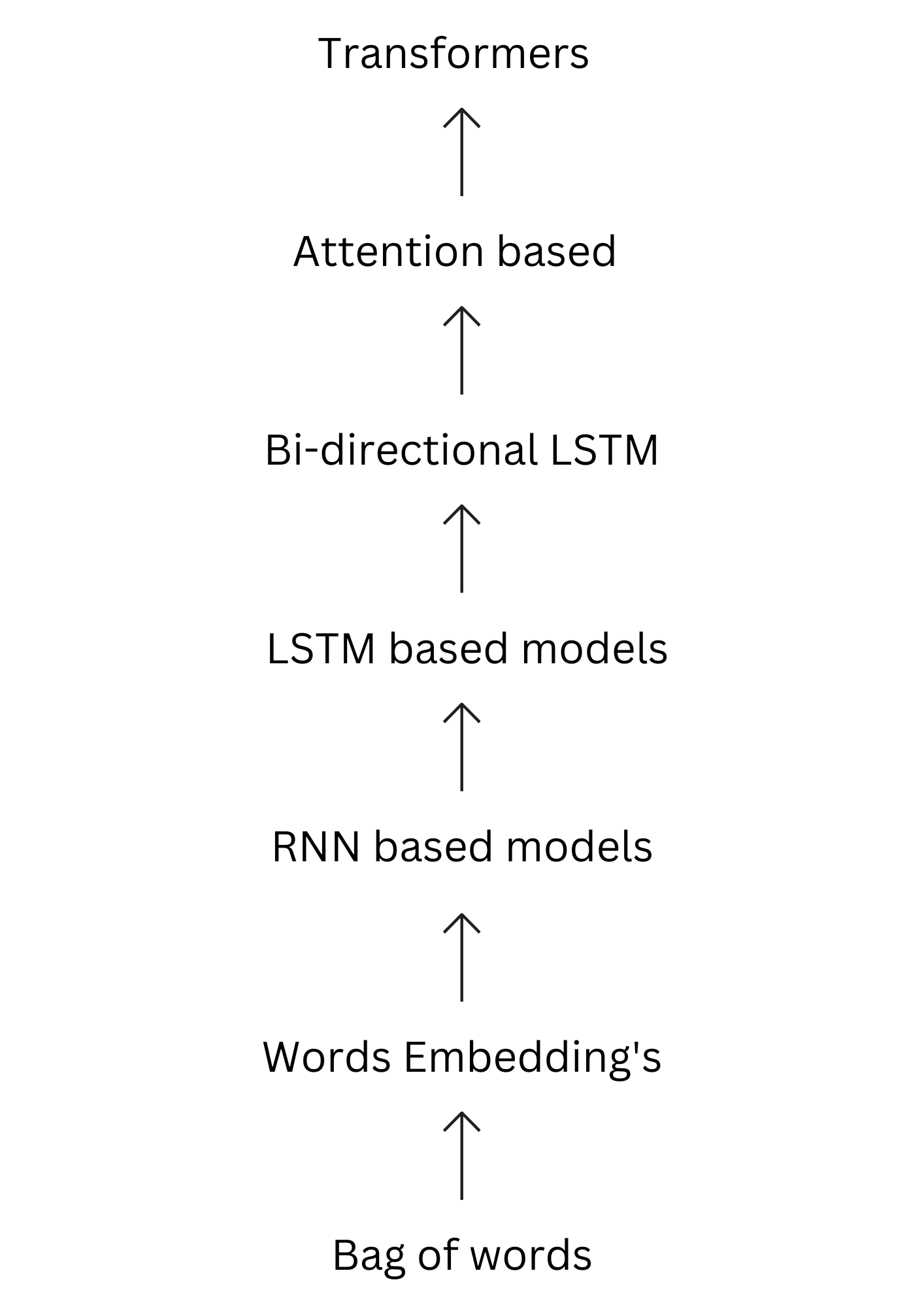
Timeline of natural language processing models

Neural language models were developed in 1990s. In 1990, the Elman network, using a recurrent neural network, encoded each word in a training set as a vector, called a word embedding, and the whole vocabulary as a vector database, allowing it to perform such tasks as sequence-predictions that are beyond the power of a simple multilayer perceptron. A shortcoming of the static embeddings was that they didn't differentiate between multiple meanings of homonyms.

In 2000, Yoshua Bengio and co-authors introduced a neural probabilistic language model that learned distributed word representations jointly with a probability model for word sequences. In 2010, Tomáš Mikolov and colleagues applied recurrent neural networks to language modeling, improving on contemporary statistical language models. In 2013, a Google research team led by Mikolov introduced word2vec, a set of architectures for learning vector representations of words from large text corpora.

The attention mechanism was introduced by Bahdanau et al. in 2014. This work laid the foundations for the famous "Attention Is All You Need" paper that introduced the Transformer architecture in 2017. The concept of large language model (LLM) emerged in late 2010s. LLMs are language models trained with self-supervised learning on vast amounts of text. The earliest publicly available LLMs had hundreds of millions of parameters, but this number quickly rose to billions and even trillions.

In recent years (around 2022), advancements in deep learning and large language models have significantly enhanced the capabilities of natural language processing, leading to widespread applications in areas such as healthcare, customer service, and content generation. Following the success of ChatGPT-3.0, several other major tech companies released their own LLMs.

In 2024, Tianhao Wu and co-authors proposed a modification to transformers, colloquially known as 'reasoning', that allows transformers to reason more effectively about problems. This was adopted more widely in 2025, with commercial models updated to allow reasoning.

== Software ==
Software	Year	Creator	Description	Ref.
Georgetown experiment	1954	Georgetown University and IBM	involved fully automatic translation of more than sixty Russian sentences into English.	
STUDENT	1964	Daniel Bobrow	could solve high school algebra word problems.	
ELIZA	1964	Joseph Weizenbaum	a simulation of a Rogerian psychotherapist, rephrasing her response with a few grammar rules.	
SHRDLU	1970	Terry Winograd	a natural language system working in restricted "blocks worlds" with restricted vocabularies, worked extremely well	
PARRY	1972	Kenneth Colby	A chatterbot	
KL-ONE	1974	Sondheimer et al.	a knowledge representation system in the tradition of semantic networks and frames; it is a frame language.	
MARGIE	1975	Roger Schank		
TaleSpin (software)	1976	Meehan		
QUALM		Lehnert		
LIFER/LADDER	1978	Hendrix	a natural language interface to a database of information about US Navy ships.	
SAM (software)	1978	Cullingford		
PAM (software)	1978	Robert Wilensky		
Politics (software)	1979	Carbonell		
Plot Units (software)	1981	Lehnert		
Jabberwacky	1982	Rollo Carpenter	chatterbot with stated aim to "simulate natural human chat in an interesting, entertaining and humorous manner".	
MUMBLE (software)	1982	McDonald		
Racter	1983	William Chamberlain and Thomas Etter	chatterbot that generated English language prose at random.	
MOPTRANS	1984	Lytinen		
KODIAK (software)	1986	Wilensky		
Absity (software)	1987	Hirst		
Dr. Sbaitso	1991	Creative Labs		
IBM Watson	2006	IBM	A question answering system that won the Jeopardy! contest, defeating the best human players in February 2011.	
Siri	2011	Apple	A virtual assistant developed by Apple.	
Cortana	2014	Microsoft	A virtual assistant developed by Microsoft.	
Amazon Alexa	2014	Amazon	A virtual assistant developed by Amazon.	
Google Assistant	2016	Google	A virtual assistant developed by Google.	
ChatGPT	2022	OpenAI	LLM	
Claude	2023	Anthropic	LLM	
Llama	2023	Meta AI	LLM	
Gemini	2024	Google	LLM	

== Bibliography ==
- Crevier, Daniel (1993). AI: The Tumultuous Search for Artificial Intelligence. New York, NY: BasicBooks. ISBN 0-465-02997-3.
- McCorduck, Pamela (2004), Machines Who Think (2nd ed.), Natick, MA: A. K. Peters, Ltd., ISBN 978-1-56881-205-2, OCLC 52197627.
- Russell, Stuart J.; Norvig, Peter (2003), Artificial Intelligence: A Modern Approach (2nd ed.), Upper Saddle River, New Jersey: Prentice Hall, ISBN 0-13-790395-2.
