= Script theory =

Psychological theory

Script theory is a psychological theory which posits that human behaviour largely falls into patterns called scripts because they function the way a written script does, by providing a program for action. Silvan Tomkins created script theory as a further development of his affect theory, which regards human beings' emotional responses to stimuli as falling into categories called affects: he noticed that the purely biological response of affect may be followed by awareness and by what we cognitively do in terms of acting on that affect, so that more was needed to produce a complete explanation of what he called human being theory.

These scripts fall under the larger cognitive concept called schemas, which are organized chunks of information. A schema is a script that has the potential to lack the specificity of the sequence of events. A schema becomes a script is when there is an ordering to it that requires action, such as the process of starting a car (get in, put on the seatbelt, turn the car on, release the emergency brake, etc.).

In script theory, the basic unit of analysis is called a scene, defined as a sequence of events linked by the affects triggered during the experience of those events. Tomkins recognized that affective experiences fall into patterns that we may group together according to criteria, such as the types of persons and places involved and the degree of intensity of the effect experienced—the patterns of which constitute scripts that inform behavior in an effort to maximize positive affect and to minimize negative affect.

== In artificial intelligence ==
Roger Schank, Robert P. Abelson and their research group extended Tomkins' scripts and used them in early artificial intelligence work as a method of representing procedural knowledge. In their work, scripts are very much like frames, except the values that fill the slots must be ordered. A script is a structured representation describing a stereotyped sequence of events in a particular context. Scripts are used in natural-language understanding systems to organize a knowledge base in terms of the situations that the system should understand.

The classic example of a script involves the typical sequence of events that occur when a person drinks in a restaurant: finding a seat, reading the menu, ordering drinks from the waitstaff, etc. In the script form, these would be decomposed into conceptual transitions, such as MTRANS and PTRANS, which refer to mental transitions [of information] and physical transitions [of things].

Schank, Abelson and their colleagues tackled some of the most difficult problems in artificial intelligence (i.e., story understanding), but ultimately their line of work ended without tangible success. This type of work received little attention after the 1980s, but became very influential in later knowledge representation techniques, such as case-based reasoning.

Scripts can be inflexible. To deal with inflexibility, smaller modules called memory organization packets (MOP) can be combined in a way that is appropriate for the situation.
