= K-line =

K-line may refer to:

== Chemistry ==
- K-line (spectrometry), one of two features in spectroscopy:
  - Calcium K line, a Fraunhofer spectral line from ionised calcium
  - K-line (x-ray), an x-ray peak in astronomical spectrometry
- K line, a term used in Internal conversion electron spectroscopy

== Computing ==
- K-line (artificial intelligence) (Knowledge-line), a mental agent in artificial intelligence
- K-line (IRC), a server ban in IRC

== Finance ==
- Candlestick chart, or K-line, a style of financial chart used to describe price movements of a security, derivative, or currency

== Sports ==
- K line, the line marking the calculation point in ski jumping

== Transportation ==
- K (Broadway Brooklyn Local), earlier KK, discontinued in 1976
- K (Eighth Avenue Local), a defunct train service on the New York City Subway, which was known as the AA until 1985
- K Ingleside, a service of the San Francisco Municipal Railway sometimes called the K Line
- K Line (Los Angeles Metro), a light rail line in Los Angeles County, California
- K (Los Angeles Railway), defunct streetcar line in Los Angeles, California
- K Line, a Japanese shipping company
- K-Line, a model railway locomotive company
- K-Line bus operator in Yorkshire, England since rebranded as Tiger Blue
- Line K (Tren Interoceánico), a planned railway service in Mexico
- K-Line, part of the ISO 9141 on-board diagnostics vehicle network interface standard
