= NGC 2110 =

Galaxy in the constellation Orion

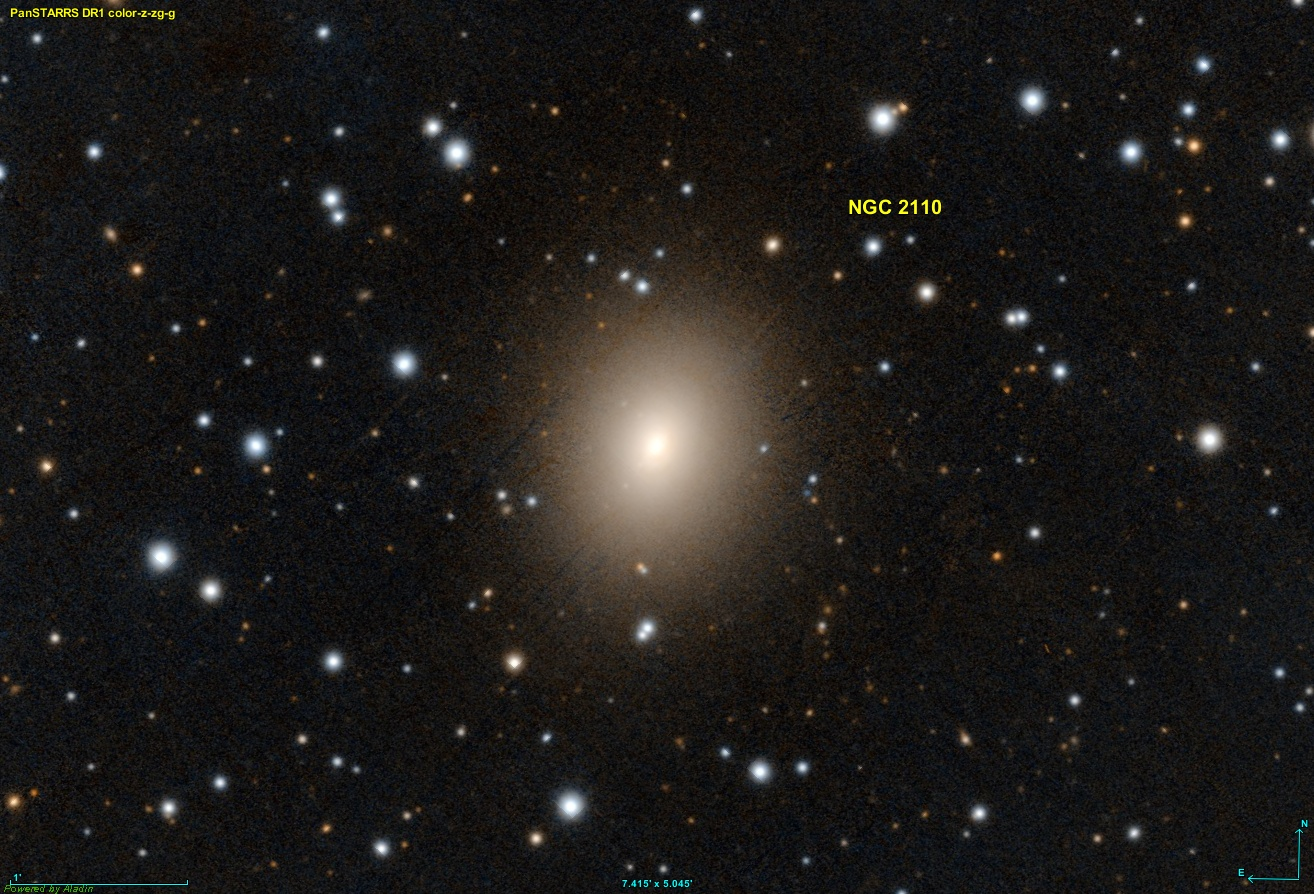
- NGC 2110 by PanSTARRS

Observation data (J2000 epoch)
- Constellation: Orion
- Right ascension: 05^{h} 52^{m} 11.4^{s}
- Declination: −07° 27′ 22″
- Redshift: 0.007647 ± 0.000063
- Heliocentric radial velocity: 2,293 ± 19 km/s
- Distance: 120 Mly (36.9 Mpc)
- Apparent magnitude (V): 13.5

Characteristics
- Type: SAB0-
- Apparent size (V): 1.7′ × 1.3′
- Notable features: Seyfert galaxy

Other designations
- MCG -01-15-004, PGC 18030

NGC 2110 is a lenticular galaxy located in the constellation Orion. It is located at a distance of about 120 million light years from Earth, which, given its apparent dimensions, means that NGC 2110 is about 90,000 light years across. It was discovered by William Herschel on October 5, 1785. It is a Seyfert galaxy.

== Characteristics ==
NGC 2110 has been categorised as a lenticular galaxy, but it had been categorised as an elliptical galaxy in the past. Images by Hubble Space Telescope revealed the presence of curved dust lanes about one arcsecond west of the nucleus. A bar of material measuring 90 by 35 parsec has been found in the nucleus in infrared.

Four star clusters have been found in the circumnuclear region by the Keck Observatory in the near infrared that form a semicircular structure with a diameter of 90 parsecs, while observations by Gemini Observatory indicate the presence of ring with stars of intermediate age (100–700 million years) with diameter of 140 parsecs. Closer to the nucleus, the star population is predominately old.

=== Active nucleus ===
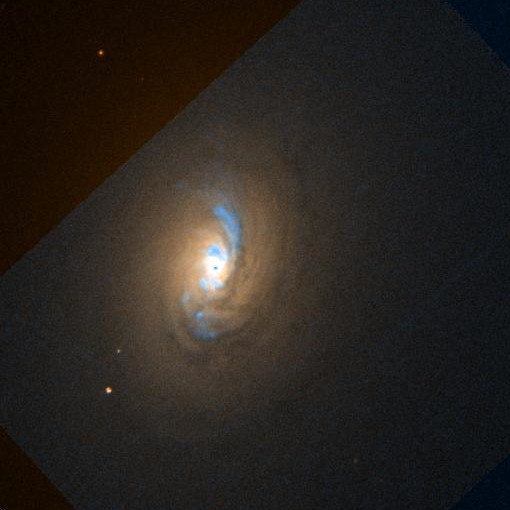
The central region of NGC 2110 by the Hubble Space Telescope.

The nucleus of NGC 2110 has been found to be active, as it a bright source of X-rays, and it has been categorised as a type II Seyfert galaxy. Type 2 Seyfert galaxies are characterised by the presence of narrow emission lines, but a broad double-peaked H-alpha emission line has been detected indicating the presence of a broad line region that is hidden by a dust torus.

The most accepted theory for the energy source of active galactic nuclei is the presence of an accretion disk around a supermassive black hole. The mass of the black hole in the centre of NGC 2110 is estimated to be 10^{9.29} (1.95 billion) M_{☉} based on velocity dispersion or 2×10^{8} M_{☉} when using the M–sigma relation.

NGC 2110 has been found to emit X-rays. The X-ray spectrum is similar to that of Seyfert 1 galaxies that is obstructed by a complex absorber, with column densities between 4 and 30 × 10^{22}/cm^{2} as measured by BeppoSAX. The presence of a patchy absorber around the nucleus along with a uniform one of lower column density was confirmed with observations made by Chandra X-ray Observatory, XMM Newton, and Suzaku. Although the FeKα line is detected, there is no detectable reflection element. The line appears to come from two components, one from distant Compton-thick material and one variable from material close to the black hole. The temperature of the hot corona of the nucleus is estimated to be 75+20
−15 keV.

When observed in radio waves, the galaxy features radio emission that extends for 4 arcseconds. The centre of the emission coincides with the nucleus, and from it emanate two jets, one north and one south, with S-shaped morphology. Similarly, north of the nucleus has been found in OIII and H-alpha+NII imaging a narrow strongly curved outflow that is one arcsecond long and looks like a jet. H-alpha imaging also reveals the presence of ionised gas in an s-shaped pattern that extends for 4 arcseconds north and south of the nucleus. In the region 4 arcseconds north of the nucleus, just beyond the end of the radio jet, has been found soft X-rays emission by Chandra X-ray Observatory. There is also soft X-rays emission south of the nucleus that extends for 30 arcseconds.

Gas kinematics of the central region of NGC 2110 indicate that there is an inflow of cold gas of 2.2 × 10^{−2} M_{☉} per year while the outflow of gas is estimated to be 0.9 M_{☉} or 0.5 M_{☉} per year. The outflow causes gas to be blueshifted by 100 km/s to the southwest of the nucleus and to be redshifted by 40 km/s to the northeast. Other kinematic components in the central region of the galaxy are a cold gas disk, with velocity dispersion of 60–90 km/s, a hot gas disk, with velocity dispersion of 220–600 km/s, and a cloud of ionised gas 1–4 arcseconds north of the nucleus. The region of the north ionised cloud is devoid of CO 2–1 emission.

== See also ==
- NGC 1386 - a similar Seyfert 2 galaxy
