= Kiri Wagstaff =

American computer scientist and planetary scientist

Kiri L. Wagstaff
- Education: University of Utah (B.S.); Cornell University (Ph.D.)
- Known for: Autonomous exploration AI for space science Mars rovers
- Awards: NASA Exceptional Achievement Medal; NASA Group Achievement Award; AAAI Fellow (2023); Lew Allen Award
- Scientific career
- Fields: Planetary science Artificial Intelligence
- Workplaces: Jet Propulsion Laboratory; California Institute of Technology
- Doctoral advisor: Claire Cardie

Kiri Lou Wagstaff is an American computer scientist and planetary scientist whose research involves the use of machine learning in the analysis of data and autonomous control of planetary rovers and other space probes. She is a senior instructor in electrical engineering and computer science at Oregon State University. At the Oregon State University Libraries, she is a Special Advisor on Artificial Intelligence.

== Education and career ==
Wagstaff was a high school student in Moab, Utah, and attended the University of Utah with the support of a program for women in mathematics and the sciences. After earning a bachelor's degree in computer science in 1997, she went to Cornell University for graduate study in natural language processing, and became part of a team of students who participated in a NASA competition on engineering support for human exploration of Mars., She earned a master's degree in 2000 and completed her Ph.D. in 2002. Her doctoral dissertation, Intelligent Clustering with Instance-Level Constraints, was supervised by Claire Cardie.

After a year working as a researcher in the Applied Physics Laboratory at Johns Hopkins University, she worked for 20 years as a principal researcher at the Jet Propulsion Laboratory. During this time she also returned to graduate study for a master's degree in geological sciences from the University of Southern California in 2008, advised by Frank Corsetti, and a master's degree in library and information science from San Jose State University in 2017. She began teaching at Oregon State University in 2020.

== Recognition ==
Wagstaff was a recipient of the Jet Propulsion Laboratory's Lew Allen Award in 2008, "for advancing the performance and application of machine learning methods to onboard and ground-based space science, Earth science and spacecraft engineering". She is a two-time recipient of the NASA Exceptional Technology Achievement Medal, in 2012 and 2020, and was elected as an AAAI Fellow in 2023. She also served as an artificial intelligence advisor in the office of Arizona Senator Mark Kelly from 2023-2024.
