= Naive semantics =

Approach used in computer science

Naive semantics is an approach used in computer science for representing basic knowledge about a specific domain, and has been used in applications such as the representation of the meaning of natural language sentences in artificial intelligence applications. In a general setting the term has been used to refer to the use of a limited store of generally understood knowledge about a specific domain in the world, and has been applied to fields such as the knowledge based design of data schemas.

In natural language understanding, naive semantics involves the use of a lexical theory which maps each word sense to a simple theory (or set of assertions) about the objects or events of reference. In this sense, naive semantic theory is based upon a particular language, its syntax and its word senses. For instance the word "water" and the assertion water(X) may be associated with the three predicates clear(X), liquid(X) and tasteless(X).
