= K-line (spectrometry) =

K-line in spectrometry refers to one of two different spectral features:

- The calcium K line, one of the pair of Fraunhofer lines in the violet associated with ionised calcium
- The x-ray peak (K-line (x-ray)) associated with iron
