= Yejin Choi =

South Korean computer scientist (born 1977)

- 최예진
- Born: 1977 (age 48–49); South Korea
- Education: Seoul National University (BS); Cornell University (PhD)
- Awards: MacArthur Fellow (2022)
- Scientific career
- Workplaces: University of Washington; Stony Brook University
- Thesis: Fine-grained opinion analysis : structure-aware approaches (2010)
- Doctoral advisor: Claire Cardie

Korean name
- Hangul: 최예진
- RR: Choe Yejin
- MR: Ch'oe Yejin
- Website: Official website

Yejin Choi (Korean: 최예진; born 1977) is the Dieter Schwarz Foundation Professor and Senior Fellow at the Department of Computer Science at Stanford University and the Stanford Institute for Human-Centered Artificial Intelligence (HAI) respectively. Her research considers natural language processing and computer vision.

== Early life and education ==
Choi is from South Korea. She attended Seoul National University. After earning a bachelor's degree in Computer Science, Choi moved to the United States, where she joined Cornell University as a graduate student. There she worked with Claire Cardie on natural language processing. After earning her doctorate, Choi joined Stony Brook University as an Assistant Professor of Computer Science. At Stony Brook University Choi developed a statistical technique to identify fake hotel reviews.

== Research and career ==
In 2018 Choi joined the Allen Institute for AI. Her research looks to endow computers with a statistical understanding of written language. She became interested in neural networks and their application in artificial intelligence. She started to assemble a knowledge base that became known as the atlas of machine commonsense (ATOMIC). By the time she had finished the creation of ATOMIC, the language model generative Pre-trained Transformer 2 (GPT-2) had been released. ATOMIC does not make use of linguistic rules, but combines the representations of different languages within a neural network.

In 2020, Choi was endowed with the Brett Helsel Professorship, which she held until she became Chair of Computer Science in 2023. She has since made use of Commonsense Transformers (COMET) with Good old fashioned artificial intelligence (GOFAI). The approach combines symbolic reasoning and neural networks. She has developed computational models that can detect biases in language that work against people from underrepresented groups. For example, one study demonstrated that female film characters are portrayed as less powerful than their male counterparts.

In 2023, Choi became The Wissner-Slivka Chair of Computer Science. Choi is also a scientific advisor to French research group Kyutai which is being funded by Xavier Niel, Rodolphe Saadé, Eric Schmidt, and others.

In 2025, Stanford HAI announced the appointment of Choi as senior fellow and the Dieter Schwarz Foundation HAI Professor and Professor of Computer Science at Stanford University.

== Awards and honours ==
- 2013 International Conference on Computer Vision Marr Prize
- 2016 Institute of Electrical and Electronics Engineers AI One to Watch
- 2017 Facebook ParlAI Research Award
- 2018 Anita Borg Early Career Award
- 2020 Association for the Advancement of Artificial Intelligence Outstanding Paper Award
- 2021 Conference on Neural Information Processing Systems Outstanding Paper Award
- 2021 Association for Computational Linguistics Test-of-time Paper Award
- 2021 Conference on Computer Vision and Pattern Recognition Longuet-Higgins Prize
- 2022 North American Chapter of the Association for Computational Linguistics Best Paper Award
- 2022 International Conference on Machine Learning Outstanding Paper Award
- 2022 MacArthur Fellowship
- 2023 Association for Computational Linguistics Best Paper Award
- 2023 TIME100 AI 2023
- 2023 Empirical Methods in Natural Language Processing Outstanding Paper Award
- 2025 Association for Computational Linguistics Outstanding Paper Award
- 2025 Association for Computational Linguistics Best Demo Paper Award
- 2025 TIME100 AI 2025

== Select publications ==
- Ott, Myle; Choi, Yejin; Cardie, Claire; Hancock, Jeffrey T. (2011). "Finding Deceptive Opinion Spam by Any Stretch of the Imagination". Proceedings of the 49th Annual Meeting of the Association for Computational Linguistics: Human Language Technologies. Portland, Oregon, USA: Association for Computational Linguistics: 309–319. arXiv:1107.4557. Bibcode:2011arXiv1107.4557O. ISBN 9781932432879. S2CID 2510724.
- Kulkarni, Girish; Premraj, Visruth; Ordonez, Vicente; Dhar, Sagnik; Li, Siming; Choi, Yejin; Berg, Alexander C.; Berg, Tamara L. (2013). "BabyTalk: Understanding and Generating Simple Image Descriptions". IEEE Transactions on Pattern Analysis and Machine Intelligence. 35 (12): 2891–2903. Bibcode:2013ITPAM..35.2891K. CiteSeerX 10.1.1.225.5228. doi:10.1109/TPAMI.2012.162. ISSN 1939-3539. PMID 22848128.
- Choi, Yejin; Cardie, Claire; Riloff, Ellen; Patwardhan, Siddharth (2005). "Identifying sources of opinions with conditional random fields and extraction patterns". Proceedings of the conference on Human Language Technology and Empirical Methods in Natural Language Processing - HLT '05. Morristown, NJ, USA: Association for Computational Linguistics. pp. 355–362. doi:10.3115/1220575.1220620.
