= Amit Singhal =

American computer engineer

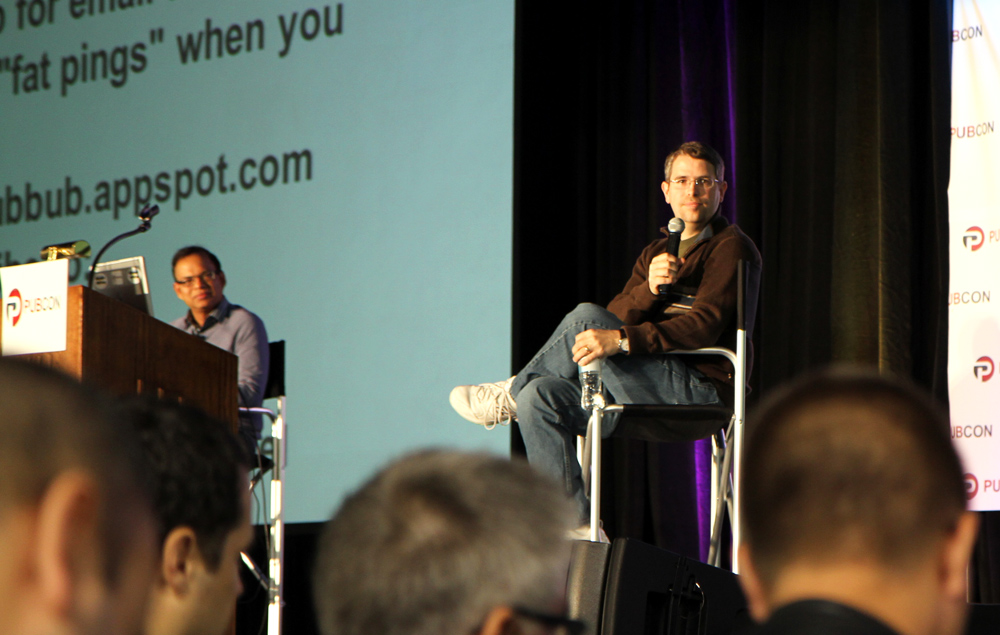
- Amit Singhal (left) and Matt Cutts (2011)
- Born: September 1968 (age 58); Jhansi, India
- Education: Cornell University (PhD, 1996); University of Minnesota Duluth (MS, 1991); IIT Roorkee (BS, 1989)
- Awards: Member of NAE; ACM Fellow
- Scientific career
- Fields: Information retrieval
- Thesis: Term weighting revisited (1997)
- Doctoral advisor: Claire Cardie; Gerard Salton
- Website: singhal.info

Amitabh Kumar "Amit" Singhal (born September 1968) is a former senior vice president at Google Inc., having been a Google Fellow and the head of Google's Search team for 15 years.

== Biography ==
Born in Jhansi, a city in the state of Uttar Pradesh, India, Singhal received a Bachelor of Engineering degree in computer science from IIT Roorkee in 1989. He continued his computer science education in the United States, and received an M.S. degree from University of Minnesota Duluth in 1991. He wrote about his time at the University of Minnesota Duluth:

UMD was the turning point in my life. Studying Information Retrieval with Don Crouch and then Don recommending that I move to Cornell to study with Gerard Salton, is the main reason behind my success today. Don gave me the love for search, I have just followed my passion ever since.

— Amit Singhal

Singhal continued his studies at Cornell University in Ithaca, New York, and received a Ph.D. degree in 1996. At Cornell, Singhal studied with Gerard Salton, a pioneer in the field of information retrieval, the academic discipline which forms the foundation of modern search. John Battelle, in his book The Search, calls Gerard Salton "the father of digital search." After getting a Ph.D. in 1996, Singhal joined AT&T Labs (previously a part of Bell Labs), where he continued his research in information retrieval, speech retrieval and other related fields.

== Controversy ==
He left Google on 26 February 2016, following sexual-harassment allegations.

He later joined Uber as Senior Vice President of software engineering in 2017 but was asked to resign for failing to disclose the reason for his resignation from Google. It was later revealed that Google paid him $35 million as his exit package.

== Career ==
In 2000, he was recruited by friend Krishna Bharat to join Google. Singhal ran Google's core search quality department where he and his team were responsible for the Google search algorithms. According to The New York Times, Singhal was the "master" of Google's ranking algorithm – the formulas that decide which Web pages best answer each user's question. As a reward for his rewrite of the search engine in 2001, Singhal was named a "Google Fellow". Singhal served as the head of Google's core search ranking team until his retirement announced on 26 February 2016.

In 2017, he joined Uber as SVP of engineering, reporting to CEO Travis Kalanick, and with his fellow Google alum Kevin Thompson operating as SVP of marketplace engineering.

== Honors and awards ==
In 2011 he was inducted as a Fellow of the Association for Computing Machinery. Fortune named Singhal one of the smartest people in tech. In 2011, Singhal was given the Outstanding Achievement in Science and Technology Award at The Asian Awards. He was elected member of the National Academy of Engineering.
