= John Ball (cognitive scientist) =

American cognitive scientist

John Samuel Ball is an American cognitive scientist, author, an expert in machine intelligence, computer architecture and the inventor of Patom Theory.

John Ball

== Biography ==
Born in 1963, Iowa USA whilst his Australian father Samuel Ball was working on his PhD in Educational Psychology. Ball returned with the family to Australia in 1978 to finish his secondary schooling on the north shore of Sydney. Ball received a Bachelor of Science in 1984 from the University of Sydney, a Masters of Cognitive Science from University of New South Wales in 1989 and a Master of Business Administration from MGSM (Macquarie Graduate School of Management) in 1997.

From a young age, Ball was fascinated by computers having been exposed to early mainframes at Educational Testing Service (ETS) in Princeton in the 1970s.

He was challenged by a lecturer as an undergraduate to pursue machine intelligence when she announced that computers would never be able to perform human like functions such as language or visual recognition.

== Work ==
His career begun at IBM Australia as a mainframe engineer, leading to country support specialist responsible for supporting and training hardware engineers across Australia and New Zealand on mainframe and I/O devices. His expertise was in the IBM 370 I/O architecture, learning from global designer of channel architecture, Kenneth Trowell. Following IBM in 1996, he worked in other large international corporations including Fujitsu, CSC and Telstra managing and defining the commercials of complex IT contracts between stakeholders.

Always interested in how machines could better emulate human brain functions, he postulated Patom theory – the word representing a combination of pattern matching and atom. This reflected his belief that the brain simply stores, matches and uses hierarchical, bidirectional linkset patterns (sequences and sets) as sufficient to explain human capabilities. This he claimed was the approach of the human brain to language and vision and was first publicly aired in 2000, on Robyn Williams’ Okham's Razor.

Over the years, exchanges with Artificial Intelligence experts such as Marvin Minsky led him to work on a prototype to demonstrate and prove his theory.

Ball left corporate life to focus full-time on proving a natural language understanding (NLU) system with samples across diverse languages including Mandarin, Korean, German, Japanese, Spanish, English, French, Italian and Portuguese. Since 2007, Ball has filed two patents.

In 2011, Ball came across a book of Emma L. Pavey's whilst visiting a Barnes & Noble store in Princeton, New Jersey. This included a reference to a linguistic theory developed by Professor Robert Van Valin, Jr. and Professor William A. Foley, called Role & Reference Grammar (RRG). Ball determined the explanation of a meaning based linguistic framework described in Pavey's book, to be the missing link for implementation of his theory. He contacted Van Valin and began integrating RRG into his prototype. Unlike dominant linguistic theories such as Universal Grammar, by Noam Chomsky, Ball's approach focused on meaning and provided a way for computers to break down any human language by meaning enabling communications between man and machine. In Van Valin's Paper, From NLP to NLU, Van Valin talks about progressing from natural language processing (NLP) to NLU with the introduction of meaning achieved by the combination of RRG & Patom theory.

In September 2014, the University of Sydney completed an external audit of the language system, analyzing its capabilities across word-sense disambiguation (WSD), context tracking, word boundary identification, machine translation, and conversation. By 2015, Ball had included samples across nine languages and could demonstrate a solution to open scientific problems in the field of NLU, including:

- Word Sense Disambiguation
- Context Tracking
- Machine Translation
- Word Boundary Identification

In 2015, Ball wrote a seven-part series for Computerworld, Speaking Artificial Intelligence in which he traced the dominant approaches of statistical analysis and machine learning, from the 1980s to the present.

Applications for this technology and its implications for intelligent machines have been published by Dr Hossein Eslambolchi in World Economic Forum.

Ball's work to date refutes the commonly held belief that the human brain ‘processes’ information like a computer. His lab work and NLU demonstrate human-like conversation and accuracy in translation, written about in his paper "Patom Theory".

In December 2018, his machine intelligence company, Pat Inc received the award of 'Best New Algorithm for AI' by London-based Awards.AI organization as recognition of his novel approach to AI-hard problem, natural-language understanding. This was followed by the Award for Best Technical Implementation for AI, 2019/2020.

His book, How to Solve AI with Our Brain - The final frontier in science published in November, 2024 was intended to make AI accessible to the public. It provides the background leading up to today's Generative AI models, what's missing and the path forward for the trustworthy language interface with machines based on brain science.

== Select publications ==
Using NLU in Context for Question Answering: Improving on Facebook's bAbI Tasks

Machine Intelligence

Can Machines Talk

Series 'Patom Theory'

Speaking Artificial Intelligence

How Brains Work: Patom Theory’s Support from RRG Linguistics

John Ball's Medium account
