= Hana Schank =

American writer and public interest technologist

- Born: April 19, 1972; California, U.S.
- Education: Northwestern University; Columbia University
- Occupations: Writer; Public interest technologist; UX designer
- Spouse: Steven Shaklan (m. 2003)
- Children: 2
- Website: hanaschank.com

Hana Raviyt Schank is an American writer, technologist, and policy strategist. She has contributed to publications such as The New York Times, The Washington Post, and The Atlantic. Schank has held positions in both the private and public sectors, including serving as Director of Strategy for Public Interest Technology at New America.

== Early life and education ==
Schank was born on April 19, 1972. She is the daughter of Roger Schank.

She earned her bachelor's degree from Northwestern University. She later received a Master of Fine Arts in nonfiction writing from Columbia University.

== Career ==
=== Private sector work ===
Schank began her career in the technology sector, including roles at Accenture and CBS News, where she was part of the launch team for the network's first website. She later founded CollectiveUX, a user-experience consultancy that provided research and design to startups, Fortune 500 companies, and nonprofits.

=== Government service ===
In 2016, Schank joined the United States Digital Service, an Obama-era initiative aimed at bringing tech expertise into the federal government. There, she worked with the Department of Homeland Security on improving digital services for the Transportation Security Administration and U.S. Customs and Border Protection.

=== New America and public interest technology ===
Following her work at USDS, Schank joined New America, a nonprofit think tank, as Director of Strategy for Public Interest Technology. In this role, she contributed to the development of the public interest technology field through research, storytelling, and fostering connections. She also launched and edited The Commons, a digital publication focused on government innovation efforts.

== Personal life ==
Schank resides in Brooklyn, New York, with her husband and two children.

In 2019, she and her family were involved in a serious car accident, resulting in a traumatic brain injury for Schank. She has since advocated for increased car safety for women.

== Bibliography ==
- Schank, Hana and Tara Dawson McGuinness. Power to the Public: The Promise of Public Interest Technology. Princeton University Press, 2021. ISBN 9780691216645
- Schank, Hana and Sara Hudson. The Government Fix: How to innovate in government. Sense and Respond Learning, 2019. ISBN 1795762950
- Schank, Hana and Elizabeth Wallace. The Ambition Decisions: What Women Know About Work, Family, and the Path to Building a Life. Penguin Books, 2018. ISBN 978-0525558859
- Schank, Hana. The Edge of Normal. Kindle Single, 2015. ASIN B00ZVD4STK
- Schank, Hana. A More Perfect Union: How I Survived the Happiest Day of My Life. Atria, 2006. ISBN 978-0743277372
