= Ellen Riloff =

American computer scientist

- Alma mater: University of Massachusetts Amherst (Ph.D. and M.S. in Computer Science); Carnegie Mellon University (B.S. in Applied Mathematics/Computer Science)
- Field: Computer Science
- Institutions: University of Utah (1994-present)
- Dissertation: "Information Extraction as a Basis for Portable Text Classification Systems"(1994)
- Doctoral advisor: Wendy Lehnert
- Website: Personal website

Ellen Riloff is an American computer scientist currently serving as a professor at the School of Computing at the University of Utah. Her research focuses on natural language processing and computational linguistics, specifically information extraction, sentiment analysis, semantic class induction, and bootstrapping methods that learn from unannotated texts.

== Education ==
After receiving her bachelor’s degree in applied mathematics (computer science) from Carnegie Mellon University, Riloff completed both her M.S. and Ph.D. in Computer Science at the University of Massachusetts Amherst, where she defended her dissertation under the guidance of Wendy Lehnert.

== Career ==
Riloff is currently a Professor of Computer Science at the University of Utah. She has served as the General Chair for the EMNLP 2018 conference, Program Co-Chair for the NAACL HLT 2012 and CoNLL 2004 conferences, on the NAACL Executive Board (2004-2005 and 2017-2018), the Computational Linguistics Editorial Board, and the Transactions of the Association for Computational Linguistics (TACL) Editorial Board.

Riloff has served as Faculty Advisor for the ACL 2007 Student Research Workshop, and in 2018, she was named a Fellow of the Association for Computational Linguistics (ACL).

== Research ==
Riloff’s primary research areas include information extraction, sentiment & affective text analysis, semantic class induction, social media analysis, coreference resolution, and medical text processing. She is best known for her work on bootstrapping, which she and Rosie Jones received an AAAI Classic Paper Award for in 2017, and information extraction, which she received an AAAI Classic Paper Honorable Mention for in 2012. Riloff has also worked more broadly on coreference resolution, sentiment analysis, active learning, and even veterinary medicine.

== Awards and recognition ==
- ACL Fellow. "For significant contributions to information extraction, and the analysis of sentiment, subjectivity and affect.". Association for Computational Linguistics (ACL), 12/10/2018
- AAAI Classic Paper Award. "Learning Dictionaries for Information Extraction by Multi-Level Bootstrapping". Sixteenth National Conference on Artificial Intelligence (AAAI-99) (2017)
- AMIA 2017 Distinguished Paper Award Finalist. "Exploiting Unlabeled Texts with Clustering-based Instance Selection for Medical Relation Classification". AMIA 2017 Annual Symposium (AMIA 2017)
- AAAI Classic Paper Honorable Mention. "Automatically Constructing a Dictionary for Information Extraction Tasks". Eleventh National Conference on Artificial Intelligence (AAAI-93) (2012)

== Publications ==
Riloff has over 140 publications that predominantly cover topics in the natural language processing field. Some of her publication topics include frame semantics, sentiment, events, and information extraction.

=== Selected publications ===
- Jiang, T. and Riloff, E. (2021) Exploiting Definitions for Frame Identification, to appear in Proceedings of the 16th Conference of the European Chapter of the Association for Computational Linguistics (EACL 2021)
- Zhuang, Y., Jiang, T. and Riloff, E. (2020) Affective Event Classification with Discourse-enhanced Self-training, The 2020 Conference on Empirical Methods in Natural Language Processing (EMNLP 2020)
- Felt, C. and Riloff, E. (2020) Recognizing Euphemisms and Dysphemisms Using Sentiment Analysis, The Second Workshop on Figurative Language Processing (FigLang2020)
- Zhuang, Y. and Riloff, E. (2020) Exploring the Role of Context to Distinguish Rhetorical and Information-Seeking Questions, The ACL 2020 Student Research Workshop (SRW)
- Ding, H., Riloff, E., and Feng, Z. (2019) Improving Human Needs Categorization of Events with Semantic Classification Proceedings of the Eighth Joint Conference on Lexical and Computational Semantics (*SEM 2019)
- Jiang, T. and Riloff, E. (2018) Learning Prototypical Goal Activities for Locations, Proceedings of the 56th Annual Meeting of the Association for Computational Linguistics (ACL 2018)
- Ding, H. and Riloff, E. (2018) Human Needs Categorization of Affective Events Using Labeled and Unlabeled Data, Proceedings of the 16th Annual Conference of the North American Chapter of the Association for Computational Linguistics: Human Language Technologies (NAACL HLT 2018)
- Riloff, E. and Jones, R. (2018) A Retrospective on Mutual Bootstrapping, in AI Magazine, Vol. 39 Number 1 (Spring 2018).
- Ding, H. and Riloff, E. (2018) Weakly Supervised Induction of Affective Events by Optimizing Semantic Consistency, Proceedings of the Thirty-Second AAAI Conference on Artificial Intelligence (AAAI-18)
