= Recursive transition network =

A recursive transition network for "fancy nouns". Note that recursion is created by the nodes labelled "Fancy noun".

A recursive transition network ("RTN") is a graph theoretical schematic used to represent the rules of a context-free grammar. RTNs have application to programming languages, natural language and lexical analysis. Any sentence that is constructed according to the rules of an RTN is said to be "well-formed". The structural elements of a well-formed sentence may also be well-formed sentences by themselves, or they may be simpler structures. This is why RTNs are described as recursive.

== See also ==
- Syntax diagram
- Computational linguistics
- Context free language
- Finite-state machine
- Formal grammar
- Parse tree
- Parsing
- Augmented transition network
