= LIFER/LADDER =

LIFER/LADDER was one of the first database natural language processing systems. It was designed as a natural language interface to a database of information about US Navy ships. This system, as described in a paper by Hendrix (1978), used a semantic grammar to parse questions and query a distributed database. It was implemented in Interlisp.

The LIFER/LADDER system could only support simple one-table queries or multiple table queries with easy join conditions.

Some examples of queries it could accept:

- What are the length, width, and draft of the Kitty Hawk?
- When will Reeves achieve readiness rating C2?
- What is the nearest ship to Naples with a doctor on board?
- What ships are carrying cargo for the United States?
- Where are they going?
- Print the American cruisers’ current positions and states of readiness?
