= Lew Allen Award =

Award of the Jet Propulsion Laboratory

Lew Allen Award for Excellence is a medal of the Jet Propulsion Laboratory. Established in 1986 as the Director’s Research Achievement Award; it was then renamed in honor of JPL's Director Lew Allen when he retired in 1990. This award recognizes significant accomplishments or leadership early in an individual's professional career at the Jet Propulsion Laboratory.

== Lew Allen Award for Excellence Recipients ==
=== Award Year ===	=== Name ===	=== Area of Achievement ===
1987	Graeme Aston	Development and advocacy of electric propulsion technology
	Lee-Lueng Fu	Analysis of ocean satellite altimetry data
	Paula J. Grunthaner	Studies of the chemical structure of interfaces in metal-semiconductor and insulator-semiconductor systems
	Stanley P. Sander	Development of experimental techniques and scientific contributions to the study of tropospheric and stratospheric chemistry
1988	Robert H. Brown	Outer planet satellite studies
	Margaret A. Frerking	Millimeter and submillimeter wavelength heterodyne receivers
	Joseph Katz	Optoelectronic devices
	Paul M. McElroy	High accuracy, light weight, graphite-epoxy panels, LDR feasibility
1989	Brian C. Beckman	Computer technology, simulation, concurrent processing
	Michael H. Freilich	Satellite oceanography, NSCAT
	Jakob J. van Zyl	Radar scattering, imaging radar polarimentry
	Howard A. Zebker	Radar polarimetry and its application to studies of surface roughness, multiple scattering, and other geophysical parameters
1990	Bonnie J. Buratti	Photometric function studies of planetary and planetary satellite surfaces
	Geoffrey Blewitt	Long-baseline geodesy using GPS
	Henry Le Duc	NbN-based Josephson-junction mixers for submillimeter astronomy
	Joseph W. Perry	Organic non-linear materials research
1991	Robert W. Fathauer and True-Lon Lin	Development of Si-based MWIR and LWIR detectors
	Randall R. Friedl	Kinetics and photochemistry of Earth’s stratosphere and the phenomenon of polar ozone depletion
	Brian D. Hunt	Thin film deposition technology and high-temperature superconductors
	William R. McGrath	Submillimeter wave superconductor-insulator-superconductor tunnel junction heterodyne receivers
1992	Michael H. Hecht	Photovoltaic effects in metal-semiconductor systems
	Kevin J. Hussey	Computer animation of remotely sensed data
	Randy D. May	Laboratory and atmospheric tuneable laser spectroscopy
	David P. Miller	Artificial intelligence for microrobotics and planetary rovers
1993	Lloyd D. Bell II	Scanning tunneling microscopy-related technologies
	Edward T. Chow	Sequence alignment coprocessors Biological Information Signal Processor
	James L. Fanson	Articulating Fold Mirrors for the Wide Field/Planetary Camera-II
	Eric R. Fossum	Focal Plane Signal Processing and High Performance Image Sensors
1994	Pierre F. Baldi	Theory and Applications of Artificial Neural Systems
	Usama M. Fayayad	Pioneer work in machine learning/advanced S/W technology to support development of scientist-trainable automated image analysis systems
	Seth R. Marder	Science of organic materials for nonlinear optics
	Patrick J. Smyth	Pattern recognition, learning and classification for the analysis of planetary images
1995	Rajiv S. Desai	Robotics and Artificial Intelligence Technology
	Sarath D. Gunapala	QWIP Long Wavelength Focal Plane Arrays
	David C. Redding	Complex Optical Systems
1996	Steve A. Chien	Computer Science
	George A. Hajj	Theoretical Physics
	Michael E. Hoenk	Physics
	Gloria L. Manney	Atmospheric Physics
1997	Yi Chao	Ocean Circulation model and in situ and satellite observations
	Alexander S. Konopliv	Innovative gravity data analysis techniques and creation of high-resolution gravity field models for the Moon, Mars, and Venus
	W. Thomas Pike	Development of the microseismometer for planetary exploration
1998	Shouleh Nikzad	Fundamental understanding and development of advanced scientific low-energy particle detectors
	Bedabrata Pain	Maintaining and expanding JPL’s lead role in advanced solid state imagers, particularly the Active Pixel Sensor
	Paul Stolorz	Data mining, image analysis, and massively parallel computing for the automated analysis of very large scientific data sets, and in the pioneering of concepts for onboard analysis of science data
1999	Michael E. Ressler	Scientific utilization of satellite radar interferometry to study the stability and mass balance of the great polar ice sheets at their junction with ocean waters
	Eric J. Rignot	Satellite radar interferometry to study the stability and mass balance of the great polar ice sheets at their junction with ocean waters
	Simon H. Yueh	Research of passive microwave polarimetric remote sensing to Earth Science investigations
2000	James Bock	Low-background SPIDER bolometer arrays, whose extremely low noise characteristics and large array sizes enable a significant step forward in submillimeter astronomy
	Son van Nghiem	Polarimetric scatterometry for Earth science remote sensing investigations and contributions to future spaceborne advanced instrument concepts
	Adrian Stoica	Evolvable hardware & for creating a world-class research center in this rapidly emerging field
2001	Richard Dekany	Development of the Palomar Adaptive Optics System which provides a dramatic new capability for the 5-m telescope & opens new areas of astrophysical research such as the search for planets
	Andrea Donnellan	New computational methods in the field of scientific data understanding systems, with applications to complex & varied natural phenomena in numerous scientific fields
	Sabrina M. Grannan (Feldman)	MECA Wet Chemistry Laboratory and the development of critical microfluidics technologies, which are enabling important new in situ measurement capabilities for NASA
2002	Ayanna Howard	Autonomous systems development, including innovative real time software tools for spacecraft precise and safe entry descending and landing applications
	Ian Joughin	Interferometric SAR for polar ice sheet topography and motion; development of remote sensing techniques for vector measurement of ice flow; contributions to Earth Science missions
	Victoria S. Meadows	Bringing to JPL an important new research endeavor in the now-evolving area of detection of biosignatures from extrasolar planets by spectroscopic observations with space-based astronomical instruments
	Juergen Mueller	Development of miniaturized thrusters and feed system components, a new area of propulsion engineering which is critical to the development of highly capable microspacecraft
2003	Serge Dubovitsky	Interferometric & formation flying technologies & space missions, and developing highly innovative optoelectronic concepts including dual target metrology and the Modulation Sideband Technology for Absolute Range (MSTAR) sensor
	Andrew Edie Johnson	Machine vision algorithms for safe and precise landing
	Dmitry Strekalov	Quantum Lithography, and creating the quantum internet tested and the single-photon quantum optics technology capabilities at JPL, which form the keystone for the larger JPL quantum Technologies, thrust area
	Daniel Wilson	Fabrication of diffractive optics by electron beam lithography, particularly as applied to convex gratings for imaging spectrometers
2004	Jennifer Dooley	Singularly responsible for establishing a significant new area of nanolaminate reflector technology at JPL and is now leading the technology effort on the large aperture technology development
	Christophe Dumas	In the application of adaptive optics to astrophysical problems. Effectively combined the techniques of diffraction-limited imaging and infrared spectroscopy to provide multispectral views of small bodies in the solar system and nearby young stars at high spatial resolution
	Eui—Hyeok Yang	Developed several significant areas of research in MEMS-based actuators for space applications, utilizing MEMS actuators for the development of high-pressure, low leak-rate microvalves, continuous membrane deformable mirrors and inch-worm devices for segmented mirror assembly and control for large aperture, space-based telescopes
2005	Andrey Matsko	For seminal and unique theoretical contributions in quantum optics, in particular the nonlinear interactions of crystalline whispering gallery mode resonators
	Alina Moussessian	Outstanding leadership and technological innovation that has enabled a new capability using lightweight active membrane antennas for space-based radar and for helping build a strong technology program
	Charles Norton	For demonstration of unique talents as a technical leader in the field of advanced parallel computing which has enabled high fidelity, efficient simulations of physical systems
	Michael Seiffert	Leadership in establishing dark energy as a new field of research at JPL and for breakthrough developments in mass-producible cryogenic radiometer arrays
2006	Daniel Stern (aka Stevens)	For revealing the early history of the Universe. Finding one of the most distant galaxies known, he inferred that the Universe remains ionized to an earlier epoch than previously believed
	Linda del Castillo	For the work in development of high temperature resistant electronics and the associated electronic packaging to be used in hostile environments such as encountered on the surface of the planet Venus
	Lorene Samoska	For the development and fostering of millimeter-wave power amplifier technology. This technology has become mission enabling for passive and active science observations in the frequency range 90-2500GHz
2007	Amanda Hendrix	For outstanding scientific leadership and major contributions to the field of ultraviolet spectroscopic research of planetary bodies
	Harish Manohara	For advancing the performance of carbon nanotube-based field emitters and Schottky diode high-frequency detectors as enabling technologies for miniature science instruments and nanoelectronics
	Adrian Ponce	For pioneering work on chemical and biological detection and instrumentation, which meets critical needs in astrobiology, planetary protection and national defense
2008	Jason Rhodes	For outstanding scientific leadership in the field of weak lensing which enabled the first large-scale measurement of the three-dimensional distribution of dark matter in our universe
	Paul Johnson	For research in the areas of atomic and molecular physics, physics and chemistry of planetary ices, and instrument development
2009	Pekka Kangaslahti	For demonstrating world leadership in the fields of monolithic microwave integrated circuit design and millimeter-wave component development, capabilities
	Ioannis Mikellides	For the development of outstanding computational models of the plasma physics in electric propulsion hollow cathodes, and of their major wear mechanisms
	Hui Su	For major advances in the understanding of water vapor and cloud feedbacks on climate change
	Kiri Wagstaff	For advancing the performance and application of machine learning methods to onboard and ground-based space science, Earth science and spacecraft engineering
2010	Charles Matt Bradford	For the development of a novel design for a submillimeter/far infrared grating spectrometer being used for ground-based discoveries and future observation from space
	Cory J. Hill	For technical innovation and leadership in developing epitaxial growth processes for advanced Sb-based optoelectronics and long wave superlattice focal plane arrays for remote sensing systems
	Jeffrey S. Norris	For exemplary vision, innovation and leadership in fundamentally advancing the capabilities for scientific involvement in planning operations on NASA's missions
	Josh Willis	For fundamental contributions to the understanding of global ocean circulation and sea level change from analysis of satellite and in-situ observations
2011	Shannon Brown	For innovations in the field of microwave radiometry as demonstrated on Topex, Jason-I and II and the novel application of radiometers to measure climate change
	Julie Castillo-Rogez	For outstanding leadership in establishing the Planetary Tides Simulation Facility and exceptional scientific accomplishments in measuring fundamental ice physical properties under planetary conditions
	Amy Mainzer	For her knowledge of solar system minor bodies based on automated methods of analyzing space infrared observations
	Nathan Strange	For expertise and innovation in gravity-assist tour design, and for both leadership and creativity in the development of novel advanced mission concepts
2012	Ken Cooper	For the development and demonstration of the world's first THz imaging radar system
	Kevin Hand	For outstanding leadership in the field of Astrobiology
	Richard Hofer	For outstanding technical contributions and leadership in establishing JPL as a world leader in Hall thruster research and development
	Eric Larour	For outstanding accomplishment in developing the Ice Sheet System Model that significantly contributes to our knowledge of Global Change
2013	Marina Brozović	For her exceptional leadership and research roles in both satellite ephemeris development and near-Earth object radar research
	Ian Clark	For exceptional leadership and achievement in the development of advanced Entry, Descent, and Landing (EDL) technologies
	Baris Erkmen	For outstanding leadership and technical accomplishments in optical communications and imaging research, especially the establishment of computational ghost imaging as a significant new area of research at JPL
	Christian Frankenberg	For quantifying global plant photosynthesis from satellite chlorophyll fluorescence observations, enabling uniquely valuable unprecedented insights into the terrestrial carbon cycle
2014	Abigail Allwood	For geobiology research and scientific leadership in Mars Sample Return impacting direction of the Mars 2020 mission
	Carmen Boening	For performing fundamental interdisciplinary research in climate science and coordinating research on sea level rise prediction at JPL
	Michael Mischna	For leadership in Mars atmospheric science research that enables improved EDL precision and advances in knowledge of Mars’ climate history
	David Thompson	For leadership of machine learning by autonomous robots and intelligent onboard analysis of large datasets
2015	Rodney Anderson	For his exceptional discoveries and leadership in the development of new trajectory design techniques, particularly the lunar low-energy trajectory design
	Michelle Gierach	For expanding the scope of JPL oceanography research in marine biophysical interaction, ecosystem dynamics, and ocean salinity science
	Robert Hodyss	For pioneering studies of the properties of cryogenic hydrocarbon liquids and critical contributions to the development of the PIXL instrument
	Aaron Parness	For development of new climbing robots and robotic grippers with widespread application to space and terrestrial exploration
2016	Darmindra Arumugam	For inventing and developing Active and Passive Magneto-Quasi-Static Positioning for long-range near-field positioning for non-line of sight environments
	Sabah Bux	For leadership in the development of novel high performance high temperature nanocomposite bulk thermoelectric materials using advanced synthetic methods
	Damon Landau	For innovation in mission architecting and mission design, and for leadership and creativity in the development of advanced mission concepts
	Jason Williams	For innovative research in ultra-cold atoms, atom interferometry, and fundamental physics
2017	Mathieu Choukroun	For pioneering studies of the physical properties of cryogenic materials and contributions to MIRO and the US Rosetta mission
	Andrew Klesh	For technical leadership of deep space smallsats and under-ice robotic rover technologies in support of terrestrial and outer planets exploration
	Boon Lim	For leadership and technological innovation in the emerging field of microwave remote sensing science on nanosatellites
	David Wiese	For exceptional leadership and research roles in GRACE data processing and Earth gravity science
2018	Piyush Agram	For major contributions to InSAR-based geodetic imaging and geophysical time series analysis.
	Nacer Chahat	For demonstrated unique talent as a leader in rapid spacecraft antenna development and telecom systems engineering for cubesats.
	Arezou Khoshakhlagh	For technical innovation in developing the novel gallium-free antimonides superlattice epitaxial material system for advanced mid-wavelength and long-wavelength infrared detectors.
	Sylvain Piqueux	For leadership in the study of surface thermal properties of terrestrial worlds, and support of JPL missions to these bodies.
2019	Laura Barge	For pioneering research on the application of electrochemistry to studies of the origin and emergence of life.
	Alex Gardner	For establishing a new unified system architecture to process Cryosphere data, leading to new scientific discoveries related to the evolution of polar ice caps.
	Cecile Jung-Kubiak	For demonstrated excellence in the development of innovative silicon micromachining techniques that have enabled novel electromagnetic, mechanical, and propulsion devices.
	Jose Siles	For the development of high-power ultra-compact room-temperature multi-pixel terahertz sources and receivers for balloon-borne and space instruments.
2020	David Farnocchia	For exceptional leadership and research roles in orbit reconstruction and prediction of asteroids and comets.
	Marco Lavalle	For sustained leadership in creating and advancing new Earth-science applications of Interferometric Synthetic Aperture Radar.
	Joseph R. Masiero	For work in establishing the physical properties of near-Earth asteroids and the threats they pose to Earth.
	Maria F. Mora	For excellence in the development and validation of chemical analysis methodology and electrophoresis instruments for future life detection missions.
2021	Brian Bue	For exceptional contributions to machine-learning for remote sensing systems.
	Morgan Cable	For exceptional contributions to our understanding of chemistry on Titan’s surface.
	Benjamin Hamlington	For exceptional contributions to understanding sea level change.
	Sidharth Misra	For exceptional contributions to digital microwave radiometry.
2022	Ali-akbar Agha-mohammadi (Ali Agha)	For exceptional leadership and technological innovation in the emerging field of AI in support of autonomous exploration of extreme terrains.
	Emmanuel Decrossas	For outstanding leadership and technological innovation advancing the field of low frequency antenna simulation and measurements.
	Jonathan Hobbs	For outstanding accomplishments in research and development of uncertainty quantification approaches for atmospheric retrievals.
	Laura Kerber	For exceptional scientific leadership and research on the geology and geophysics of the terrestrial planets and of the Moon.
2023	David Bekaert	For his leadership in applying radar and optical remote sensing to societal needs, and for leading the OPERA Science Team.
	Tuan Vu	For his pioneering experimental work on the chemical composition and geological processes of icy worlds.
	Emma Wollman	For outstanding record of innovation in superconducting nanowire single photon detectors and their implementation in the DSOC project.
2024	Scott N. Roberts	For outstanding intellectual leadership in printed porous materials technology foundational to advancements in thermal, structural and propulsion applications.
	James Sinclair	For exceptional leadership advancing outer-planet atmospheric research and our understanding of atmospheric-magnetospheric interactions.
	Jennifer Scully	For outstanding contributions to Dawn, Europa Clipper’s Reconnaissance Focus Group activities, and dedication to community service and inclusion.
	Rashmi Shah	For outstanding achievements and leadership spanning science and engineering in the emergent field of Signals of Opportunity remote sensing.

== See also ==
- List of space technology awards
- List of awards named after people
