= K-line (artificial intelligence) =

Type of mental agent

A K-line, or Knowledge-line, is a mental agent which represents an association of a group of other mental agents found active when a subject solves a certain problem or formulates a new idea. These were first described in Marvin Minsky's essay K-lines: A Theory of Memory, published in 1980 in the journal Cognitive Science:

When you "get an idea," or "solve a problem" ... you create what we shall call a K-line. ... When that K-line is later "activated", it reactivates ... mental agencies, creating a partial mental state "resembling the original."

"Whenever you 'get a good idea', solve a problem, or have a memorable experience, you activate a K-line to 'represent' it. A K-line is a wirelike structure that attaches itself to whichever mental agents are active when you solve a problem or have a good idea.

When you activate that K-line later, the agents attached to it are aroused, putting you into a 'mental state' much like the one you were in when you solved that problem or got that idea. This should make it relatively easy for you to solve new, similar problems!" (1998, p. 82.)

== Theoretical implications ==
The concept of K-lines has several theoretical implications for understanding memory and problem-solving in artificial intelligence and cognitive science:

- It suggests that memory is not a static storage of information, but rather a dynamic association of mental agents activated during an experience.
- K-lines provide a mechanism for generalizing from specific experiences to similar problems by reactivating the associated mental agents.
- The theory implies that memory and problem-solving are distributed processes involving the coordination of multiple mental agents rather than a single central system.

== Limitations and criticisms ==
While influential, the K-line theory has also faced some criticism and limitations:

- The exact nature and implementation of K-lines in the brain or in artificial systems remains unclear and speculative.
- The theory does not provide a complete account of all aspects of memory and cognition, such as the role of language, emotions, and social interactions.
- Some argue that the theory is too vague or metaphorical to be scientifically testable or to yield specific predictions.
