= Sydney Lamb =

American linguist

- Born: Sydney MacDonald Lamb; May 4, 1929 (age 97); Denver, Colorado, U.S.
- Known for: Relational Network Theory
- Parents: Sydney Bishop Lamb (father); Jean MacDonald (mother)

Academic background
- Education: University of California, Berkeley (PhD; 1957); Yale University (BA; 1951)
- Thesis: Mono Grammar (1957)
- Doctoral advisor: Mary Haas
- Influences: Ferdinand de Saussure, Jan Baudouin de Courtenay, Roman Jakobson, Louis Hjelmslev, Charles Hockett, H.A. Gleason Jr., Michael Halliday, Vernon Mountcastle

Academic work
- Discipline: Linguistics, cognitive science, neuroscience
- Institutions: Rice University (1981–present); Center for Advanced Study in the Behavioral Sciences, Stanford University (1973–1974); Yale University (1964–1977); University of California, Berkeley (1956–1964)
- Doctoral students: Adam Makkai, William J. Sullivan, William M. Christie Jr.
- Website: www.ruf.rice.edu/~lamb/sketch.htm

Sydney MacDonald Lamb (born May 4, 1929 in Denver, Colorado) is an American linguist. He is the Arnold Professor Emeritus of Linguistics and Cognitive Science at Rice University. His scientific contributions have been wide-ranging, including those to historical linguistics, computational linguistics, and the theory of linguistic structure.

Lamb is best known for his development of Relational Network Theory (RNT; formerly known as Stratificational Grammar), starting in the early 1960s. The key insight of RNT is that linguistic systems such as phonology, morphology, syntax, and semantics are best described as networks of relationships rather than computational operations upon symbols (which is the view taken in many frameworks of formal linguistics, such as Chomskyan Generative Grammar). Lamb developed a set of graphical formalisms, known as "abstract" and "narrow" relational network notation, for the analysis of linguistic networks based on the system network notation created by Michael Halliday for Systemic Functional Linguistics.

Between the 1960s and 1990s, he further developed RNT by exploring its possible relationships to neurological structures and to thinking processes, especially the hypothesis that the nodes in his relational networks might correspond to cortical columns or minicolumns in the human neocortex. Halliday states that Lamb was aware of a possible correspondence between relational networks and neurological networks as early as 1963. In 1999, he published Pathways of the Brain: The Neurocognitive Basis of Language, a monograph expressing these ideas. Since then, Lamb's framework has also been referred to as Neurocognitive Linguistics (NCL).

His early work also developed the notion of "sememe" as a semantic object, analogous to the morpheme or phoneme in linguistics, and it was one of the inspirations for Roger Schank's Conceptual dependency theory, a methodology for representing language meaning directly within the Artificial Intelligence movement of the 1960s and 1970s.

== Biography ==
Lamb's paternal great-grandfather immigrated from England to Illinois in the United States in the 19th century. Later, his grandfather, along with his grandmother and father (as a child), then moved from Illinois to Denver, Colorado in 1889. Lamb's mother's family arrived in Denver from Scotland in 1910. Sydney Lamb was born in Denver in 1929.

Lamb earned his Ph.D. from the University of California, Berkeley in 1958 and taught there from 1956 to 1964. Lamb did research in North American Indian languages, specifically those geographically centered in California. His dissertation was a grammar of the Uto-Aztecan language Mono, under the direction of Mary Haas and Murray B. Emeneau. In 1964, he began teaching at Yale University, where he remained until leaving Yale in 1977 and founding Semionics Associates, an electronics firm, in Berkeley, California. His work at Semionics Associates led to patented designs of content-addressable memory (CAM) hardware for microcomputers based on his Relational Network Theory.

By 1980, Lamb was in negotiations to sell his CAM design to another company, and he was invited to join the Department of Linguistics at Rice University by James E. Copeland.

== See also ==
"Linguistic and Cognitive Networks" in Cognition: A Multiple View (ed. Paul Garvin) New York: Spartan Books, 1970, pp. 195–222. Reprinted in Makkai and Lockwood, Readings in Stratificational Linguistics (1973), pp. 60–83.
