= Robert Wilensky =

American computer scientist

- Born: March 26, 1951; Brooklyn, NY, US
- Died: March 15, 2013 (aged 61); Oakland, California
- Education: Yale University (BS, PhD)
- Known for: Artificial intelligence Natural Language Processing
- Scientific career
- Fields: Computer Science
- Workplaces: University of California, Berkeley
- Thesis: Understanding Goal-Based Stories (1978)
- Doctoral advisor: Roger Schank
- Doctoral students: Dan Jurafsky; Peter Norvig; Marti Hearst

Robert Wilensky (26 March 1951 – 15 March 2013) was an American computer scientist and professor at the UC Berkeley School of Information, with his main focus of research in artificial intelligence.

== Academic career ==
In 1971, Wilensky received his bachelor's degree in mathematics from Yale University, and in 1978, a Ph.D. in computer science from the same institution. After finishing his thesis, "Understanding Goal-Based Stories", Wilensky joined the faculty from the EECS Department of UC Berkeley. In 1986, he worked as the doctoral advisor of Peter Norvig, who then later published the standard textbook of the field: Artificial Intelligence: A Modern Approach.

From 1993 to 1997, Wilensky was the Berkeley Computer Science Division Chair. During this time, he also served as director of the Berkeley Cognitive Science Program, director of the Berkeley Artificial Intelligence Research Project, and board member of the International Computer Science Institute.

In 1997, he became a fellow of the Association for Computing Machinery "for research contributions to the areas of natural language processing and digital libraries as well as outstanding leadership in Computer Science." Furthermore, he also was a Fellow of the Association for the Advancement of Artificial Intelligence.

He retired from faculty in 2007 and died on Friday, March 15, 2013, of a bacterial infection at the Alta Bates Summit Medical Center. Wilensky was married to Ann Danforth and he is survived by her and their two children, Avi and Eli Wilensky

== Research ==
Throughout his career, Wilensky authored and co-authored over 60 scholarly articles and technical reports on AI, natural language processing, and information dissemination. In addition to his numerous technical publications, Wilensky also published two books on the programming language LISP, LISPcraft and Common LISPcraft, and had almost completed another book manuscript when he suffered a cardiac arrest and stopped writing.

Among his publications are:

- R. Wilensky, (1986-09-17). Common LISPcraft. W. W. Norton & Company. ISBN 9780393955446.
- T. A. Phelps and R. Wilensky, "Toward active, extensible, networked documents: Multivalent architecture and applications," in Proc. 1st ACM Intl. Conf. on Digital Libraries, E. A. Fox and G. Marchionini, Eds., New York, NY: ACM Press, 1996, pp. 100–108.
- J. Traupman and R. Wilensky, "Experiments in Improving Unsupervised Word Sense Disambiguation," University of California, Berkeley, Department of EECS, Computer Science Division, Tech. Rep. 03–1227, Feb. 2003.
- R. Wilensky, Planning and Understanding: A Computational Approach to Human Reasoning, Advanced Book Program, Reading, MA: Addison-Wesley Publishing Co., 1983.
- R. Wilensky, "Understanding Goal-Based Stories," Yale University, Sep. 1978.
- B. Kahn and R. Wilensky, "A Framework for Distributed Digital Object Services", May 1995.

== See also ==
- UC Berkeley School of Information
- International Computer Science Institute
- Peter Norvig
