= K-line (x-ray) =

Spectral peak in astronomical spectrometry

The K-line is a spectral peak in astronomical spectrometry used, along with the L-line, to observe and describe the light spectrum of stars.

The K-line is associated with iron (Fe) and is described as being from emissions at ~6.4keV (thousands of electron volts).

On 5 October 2006 NASA announced the results of research using the Japanese JAXA Suzaku satellite, after earlier work with the XMM-Newton satellite. "The observations include clocking the speed of a black hole's spin rate and measuring the angle at which matter pours into the void, as well as evidence for a wall of X-ray light pulled back and flattened by gravity." The study teams observed X-ray emissions from the "broad iron K line" near the event horizon of several super-massive black holes of galaxies called MCG-6-30-15 and MCG-5-23-16. The normally narrow K-line is broadened by the doppler shift (red shift or blue shift) of the X-ray light emitted by matter being affected by the gravity of the black hole, a phenomenon called relativistic reflection. The results coincide with predictions Albert Einstein's theory of general relativity. The teams were led by Andrew Fabian of Cambridge University, England, and James Reeves of NASA's Goddard Space Flight Center, Greenbelt, Maryland, United States.

== See also ==
- K- and L- Electron shell
- Siegbahn notation
