= Janet L. Kolodner =

American cognitive scientist

Janet Kolodner
- Born: Janet Lynne Kolodner
- Education: Brandeis University (BS); Yale University (MS, PhD)
- Awards: AAAI Fellow (1992)
- Scientific career
- Fields: Case-based reasoning
- Workplaces: Boston College; Georgia Institute of Technology
- Thesis: Retrieval and organizational strategies in conceptual memory : a computer model (1980)
- Doctoral students: Katia Sycara
- Website: www.bc.edu/bc-web/schools/lynch-school/faculty-research/faculty-directory/janet-kolodner.html

Janet Lynne Kolodner is an American cognitive scientist and learning scientist. She is a Professor of the Practice at the Lynch School of Education at Boston College and co-lead of the MA Program in Learning Engineering. She is also Regents' Professor Emerita in the School of Interactive Computing, College of Computing at the Georgia Institute of Technology. She was Founding Editor in Chief of The Journal of the Learning Sciences and served in that role for 19 years. She was Founding Executive Officer of the International Society of the Learning Sciences (ISLS). From August, 2010 through July, 2014, she was a program officer at the National Science Foundation and headed up the Cyberlearning and Future Learning Technologies program (originally called Cyberlearning: Transforming Education). Since finishing at NSF, she is working toward a set of projects that will integrate learning technologies coherently to support disciplinary and everyday learning, support project-based pedagogy that works, and connect to the best in curriculum for active learning.

== Education ==
Kolodner graduated with a Bachelor of Arts degree in math and computer science from Brandeis University in 1976. She then completed her Master of Science degree in computer science in 1977 and her PhD in computer science in 1980 from Yale University.

== Career and research ==
Kolodner is a Regents' Professor Emerita of Computing and Cognitive Science in the School of Interactive Computing in Georgia Tech's College of Computing. She spent the 1996-97 academic year as a Visiting Professor Hebrew University of Jerusalem in Israel. From August, 2010 until July, 2014, she was on loan to The National Science Foundation, where she was a Program Officer in the CISE and EHR Directorates and had responsibility for the Cyberlearning: Transforming Education program (renamed Cyberlearning and Future Learning Technologies and, in 2020, RETTL).

In 1992, Kolodner was elected a fellow in the Association for the Advancement of Artificial Intelligence (AAAI) for "pioneering research on case-based reasoning and learning, including memory organization, information retrieval, problem solving, and knowledge acquisition." In 2017, she was elected an Inaugural Fellow of the International Society of the Learning Sciences (ISLS).

Kolodner's research addresses issues in learning, memory, and problem solving, both in computers and in people. She pioneered the computer reasoning method called case-based reasoning, a way of solving problems based on analogies to past experiences, and her lab emphasized case-based reasoning for situations of real-world complexity. In case-based reasoning, the results of previous cases are applied to new situations, cutting down the complexity of the reasoning necessary in later situations and allowing a problem solver to anticipate and avoid previously-made mistakes. Automated case-based reasoners from her lab include MEDIATOR and PERSUADER, common sense and expert mediation programs; JULIA, a case-based design problem solver; CELIA, a case-based car mechanic; MEDIC, a case-based physician; and EXPEDITOR, a case-based logistics manager. Kolodner's classic work in this area, Case-based Learning (1993), has been cited thousands of times by researchers.

Her research interests are the implications and applications of cognition to education and educational technology, artificial intelligence, cognitive science, case-based reasoning, novice-expert evolution, the role of experience in expert and common-sense reasoning, design cognition, creativity, design of decision-aiding tools, and interactive learning environments.

=== Publications ===
Kolodner has published the following books and articles:

- Kolodner, J. L. et al. (lead author; 2010 - 2020). Project-Based Inquiry Science, a set of 13 science units covering 3 years of middle school science. It's About Time Inc. Mt. Kisco, NY.
- Bruckman, A.S., Guzdial, M., Kolodner, J.L., Ram, A., (Eds.) (1998). Proceedings of the International Conference of the Learning Sciences 1998. AACE, Charlottesville, VA, 1998.
- Kolodner, J. L. (1993). Case-Based Reasoning. Morgan-Kaufmann Publishers, Inc., San Mateo, CA.
- Kolodner, J.L. (Ed.), (1993). Case-Based Learning. Kluwer Academic Publishers, Dordrecht, Netherlands.
- Kolodner, J.L. (Ed.) (1988). Proceedings: Case-Based Reasoning Workshop. Morgan Kaufmann Publishers, Inc., San Mateo, CA.
- Kolodner, J.L. & Riesbeck, C. (Eds.) (1986). Experience, Memory, and Reasoning. Lawrence Erlbaum Associates, Inc., Hillsdale, NJ.
- Kolodner, J.L. (1984). Retrieval and Organizational Strategies in Conceptual Memory: A Computer Model. Lawrence Erlbaum, Associates, Inc., Hillsdale, NJ.
- Tawfik, A.A. & Kolodner, J.L. (2016). 'Systematizing scaffolding for problem-based learning: A view from case-based reasoning'. The Interdisciplinary Journal of Problem-Based learning. 10(1). Retrieved from https://docs.lib.purdue.edu/ijpbl/vol10/iss1/6/
