= Language resource =

Linguistic material used for various types of language research and processing

In linguistics and language technology, a language resource is a "[composition] of linguistic material used in the construction, improvement and/or evaluation of language processing applications, (...) in language and language-mediated research studies and applications."

According to Bird & Simons (2003), this includes

1. data, i.e. "any information that documents or describes a language, such as a published monograph, a computer data file, or even a shoebox full of handwritten index cards. The information could range in content from unanalyzed sound recordings to fully transcribed and annotated texts to a complete descriptive grammar",
2. tools, i.e., "computational resources that facilitate creating, viewing, querying, or otherwise using language data", and
3. advice, i.e., "any information about what data sources are reliable, what tools are appropriate in a given situation, what practices to follow when creating new data". The latter aspect is usually referred to as "best practices" or "(community) standards".

In a narrower sense, language resource is specifically applied to resources that are available in digital form, and then, "encompassing (a) data sets (textual, multimodal/multimedia and lexical data, grammars, language models, etc.) in machine readable form, and (b) tools/technologies/services used for their processing and management".

== Typology ==
As of May 2020, no widely used standard typology of language resources has been established (current proposals include the LREMap, METASHARE, and, for data, the LLOD classification). Important classes of language resources include

1. data
  1. lexical resources, e.g., machine-readable dictionaries,
  2. linguistic corpora, i.e., digital collections of natural language data,
  3. linguistic data bases such as the Cross-Linguistic Linked Data collection,
2. tools
  1. linguistic annotations and tools for creating such annotations in a manual or semiautomated fashion (e.g., tools for annotating interlinear glossed text such as Toolbox and FLEx, or other language documentation tools),
  2. applications for search and retrieval over such data (corpus management systems), for automated annotation (part-of-speech tagging, syntactic parsing, semantic parsing, etc.),
3. metadata and vocabularies
  1. vocabularies, repositories of linguistic terminology and language metadata, e.g., MetaShare (for language resource metadata), the ISO 12620 data category registry (for linguistic features, data structures and annotations within a language resource), or the Glottolog database (identifiers for language varieties and bibliographical database).

== Language resource publication, dissemination and creation ==
A major concern of the language resource community has been to develop infrastructures and platforms to present, discuss and disseminate language resources. Selected contributions in this regard include:

- a series of International Conferences on Language Resources and Evaluation (LREC),
- the European Language Resources Association (ELRA, EU-based), and the Linguistic Data Consortium (LDC, US-based), which represent commercial hosting and dissemination platforms for language resources,
- the Open Languages Archives Community (OLAC), which provides and aggregates language resource metadata,
- the Language Resources and Evaluation Journal (LREJ),
- the Language Grid, a service-oriented platform for sharing and combining language resources as Web services,
- the European Language Grid is a European platform for language technologies (eg services), data and resources.

As for the development of standards and best practices for language resources, these are subject of several community groups and standardization efforts, including

- ISO Technical Committee 37: Terminology and other language and content resources (ISO/TC 37), developing standards for all aspects of language resources,
- W3C Community Group Best Practices for Multilingual Linked Open Data (BPMLOD), working on best practice recommendations for publishing language resources as Linked Data or in RDF,
- W3C Community Group Linked Data for Language Technology (LD4LT), working on linguistic annotations on the web and language resource metadata,
- W3C Community Group Ontology-Lexica (OntoLex), working on lexical resources,
- the Open Linguistics working group of the Open Knowledge Foundation, working on conventions for publishing and linking open language resources, developing the Linguistic Linked Open Data cloud,
- the Text Encoding Initiative (TEI), working on XML-based specifications for language resources and digitally edited text.
