= Machine-readable medium and data =

Medium capable of storing data in a format readable by a machine

ISBN, a unique numeric book identifier, represented as an EAN-13 bar code. Showing both machine-readable bars, and human-readable digits.

In communications and computing, a machine-readable medium (or computer-readable medium) is a medium capable of storing data in a format easily readable by a digital computer or a sensor. It contrasts with human-readable medium and data.

The result is called machine-readable data or computer-readable data, and the data itself can be described as having machine-readability.

== Data ==
Machine-readable data must be structured data.

Attempts to create machine-readable data occurred as early as the 1960s. At the same time that seminal developments in machine-reading and natural-language processing were releasing (like Weizenbaum's ELIZA), people were anticipating the success of machine-readable functionality and attempting to create machine-readable documents. One such example was musicologist Nancy B. Reich's creation of a machine-readable catalog of composer William Jay Sydeman's works in 1966.

In the United States, the OPEN Government Data Act of 14 January 2019 defines machine-readable data as "data in a format that can be easily processed by a computer without human intervention while ensuring no semantic meaning is lost." The law directs U.S. federal agencies to publish public data in such a manner, ensuring that "any public data asset of the agency is machine-readable".

Machine-readable data may be classified into two groups: human-readable data that is marked up so that it can also be read by machines (e.g. microformats, RDFa, HTML), and data file formats intended principally for processing by machines (CSV, RDF, XML, JSON). These formats are only machine readable if the data contained within them is formally structured; exporting a CSV file from a badly structured spreadsheet does not meet the definition.

Machine readable is not synonymous with digitally accessible. A digitally accessible document may be online, making it easier for humans to access via computers, but its content is much harder to extract, transform, and process via computer programming logic if it is not machine-readable.

Extensible Markup Language (XML) is designed to be both human- and machine-readable, and Extensible Stylesheet Language Transformations (XSLT) is used to improve the presentation of the data for human readability. For example, XSLT can be used to automatically render XML in Portable Document Format (PDF). Machine-readable data can be automatically transformed for human-readability but, generally speaking, the reverse is not true.

For purposes of implementation of the Government Performance and Results Act (GPRA) Modernization Act, the Office of Management and Budget (OMB) defines "machine readable format" as follows: "Format in a standard computer language (not English text) that can be read automatically by a web browser or computer system. (e.g.; xml). Traditional word processing documents and portable document format (PDF) files are easily read by humans but typically are difficult for machines to interpret. Other formats such as extensible markup language (XML), (JSON), or spreadsheets with header columns that can be exported as comma separated values (CSV) are machine readable formats. As HTML is a structural markup language, discreetly labeling parts of the document, computers are able to gather document components to assemble tables of contents, outlines, literature search bibliographies, etc. It is possible to make traditional word processing documents and other formats machine readable but the documents must include enhanced structural elements."

== Media ==
Examples of machine-readable media include magnetic media such as magnetic disks, cards, tapes, and drums, punched cards and paper tapes, optical discs, barcodes and magnetic ink characters.

Common machine-readable technologies include magnetic recording, processing waveforms, and barcodes. Optical character recognition (OCR) can be used to enable machines to read information available to humans. Any information retrievable by any form of energy can be machine-readable.

Examples include:

- Acoustics
- Chemical
  - Photochemical
- Electrical
  - Semiconductor used in volatile RAM microchips
  - Floating-gate transistor used in non-volatile memory cards
  - Radio transmission
- Magnetic storage
- Mechanical
  - Tins And Swins
    - Punched card
    - Paper tape
      - Music roll
    - Music box cylinder or disk
  - Grooves (See also: Audio Data)
    - Phonograph cylinder
    - Gramophone record
    - DictaBelt (groove on plastic belt)
    - Capacitance Electronic Disc
- Optics
  - Optical storage
- Thermodynamic

== Applications ==
=== Documents ===
A machine-readable document is a document whose content can be readily processed by computers. Such documents are distinguished from more general machine-readable data by virtue of having further structure to provide the necessary context to support the business processes for which they are created.

=== Catalogs ===
MARC (Machine-Readable Cataloging) is a set of metadata standards intended to be optimized for items cataloged by libraries, such as books, journals, and digital resources. Developed by Henriette Avram at the Library of Congress in the 1960s, it established the foundational data protocol that allowed libraries to share bibliographic resources electronically and ultimately optimized the transition from physical paper card catalogs to computerized catalog databases.

The standard provides a machine-readable structure to encode cataloging information, authority records, classification systems, and holdings information. By standardizing how bibliographic cataloging elements (i.e. authors, titles, publication dates, subject headings, number of pages, size, etc.) are formatted and identified, MARC can increase the functionality of integrated library systems across different institutions globally.

Since its inception, MARC standards has evolved into a family of related standards, the most widely adopted being MARC 21, which was created in 1999 through the harmonization of United States and Canadian MARC formats. While MARC 21 remains the predominant bibliographic standard in the global library community, it relies on a data architecture rooted in 1960s magnetic tape-storage technology. Consequently, the library sector is actively developing and transitioning toward modern, linked data frameworks, most notably BIBFRAME, to better integrate library catalogs with the broader semantic web.

=== Dictionaries ===
Machine-readable dictionary (MRD) is a dictionary stored as machine-readable data instead of being printed on paper. It is an electronic dictionary and lexical database.

A machine-readable dictionary is a dictionary in an electronic form that can be loaded in a database and can be queried via application software. It may be a single language explanatory dictionary or a multi-language dictionary to support translations between two or more languages or a combination of both. Translation software between multiple languages usually apply bidirectional dictionaries. An MRD may be a dictionary with a proprietary structure that is queried by dedicated software (for example online via internet) or it can be a dictionary that has an open structure and is available for loading in computer databases and thus can be used via various software applications. Conventional dictionaries contain a lemma with various descriptions. A machine-readable dictionary may have additional capabilities and is therefore sometimes called a smart dictionary. An example of a smart dictionary is the Open Source Gellish English dictionary.

The term dictionary is also used to refer to an electronic vocabulary or lexicon as used for example in spelling checkers. If dictionaries are arranged in a subtype-supertype hierarchy of concepts (or terms) then it is called a taxonomy. If it also contains other relations between the concepts, then it is called an ontology. Search engines may use either a vocabulary, a taxonomy or an ontology to optimise the search results. Specialised electronic dictionaries are morphological dictionaries or syntactic dictionaries.

The term MRD is often contrasted with NLP dictionary, in the sense that an MRD is the electronic form of a dictionary which was printed before on paper. Although being both used by programs, in contrast, the term NLP dictionary is preferred when the dictionary was built from scratch with NLP in mind. An ISO standard for MRD and NLP is able to represent both structures and is called Lexical Markup Framework.

=== Passports ===
A machine-readable passport (MRP) is a machine-readable travel document (MRTD) with the data on the identity page encoded in optical character recognition format. Many countries began to issue machine-readable travel documents in the 1980s. Most travel passports worldwide are MRPs. The International Civil Aviation Organization (ICAO) required all ICAO member states to issue only MRPs as of April 1, 2010, with all non-MRP passports expiring by November 24, 2015.

Machine-readable passports are standardized by the ICAO Document 9303 (endorsed by the International Organization for Standardization and the International Electrotechnical Commission as ISO/IEC 7501-1) and have a special machine-readable zone (MRZ), which is usually at the bottom of the identity page at the beginning of a passport. The ICAO 9303 describes three types of documents corresponding to the ISO/IEC 7810 sizes:

- "Type 3" is typical of passport booklets. The MRZ consists of 2 lines × 44 characters.
- "Type 2" is relatively rare with 2 lines × 36 characters.
- "Type 1" is of a credit card-size with 3 lines × 30 characters.

The fixed format allows specification of document type, name, document number, nationality, date of birth, sex, and document expiration date. All these fields are required on a passport. There is room for optional, often country-dependent, supplementary information. There are also two sizes of machine-readable visas similarly defined.

Computers with a camera and suitable software can directly read the information on machine-readable passports. This enables faster processing of arriving passengers by immigration officials, and greater accuracy than manually-read passports, as well as faster data entry, more data to be read and better data matching against immigration databases and watchlists.

Apart from optically readable information, many passports contain an RFID chip which enables computers to read a higher amount of information, for example a photo of the bearer. These passports are called biometric passports and are also described by ICAO 9303.

== See also ==
- Paper data storage
- Symmetric Phase Recording
- Open data
- Linked data
- Human-readable medium and data
- Semantic Web
- Machine-readable postal marking
