= XDXF =

- Filename extension: .xdxf
- Internet media type: application/xml
- Developed by: Initial development by Sergey Singov, later by Leonid Soshinskiy
- Initial release: 10 September 2006; 18 years ago
- Latest release: rev.34 January 19, 2022; 3 years ago
- Type of format: XML dictionary format
- Open format?: Yes
- Website: github.com/soshial/xdxf_makedict/

XDXF (XML Dictionary eXchange Format) is a project to unite all existing open dictionaries and provide both users and developers with a universal XML-based format, convertible from and to other popular formats like Mova, PtkDic, and StarDict.

== Available dictionaries ==
As of December 15, 2006 the XDXF project repository contains 615 dictionaries, which are collectively 936,189,613 bytes in size (compressed) and contain 24,804,355 articles.

== Software ==
=== GUIs ===
The XDXF file format is used by Alpus, SimpleDict and GoldenDict. Also StarDict starting with version 2.4.6 has basic support for XDXF.

=== Converters ===
There are numerous converters: pyglossary, xdxf2slob and others. Initially, the project had its own converter, but it was deprecated.

== Alternatives ==
Many languages serve a similar purpose, e.g., the Lexical Markup Framework (XML and other serializations), OntoLex (RDF), DICT (text format), or the dicML markup languages. As for dicML and XDXF, neither concept is specified completely. For example, XDXF lacks elements to annotate possible hyphenations, while the recent working draft of dicML does not include elements to describe the etymology of words.
