= UBY-LMF =

UBY-LMF is a format for standardizing lexical resources for Natural Language Processing (NLP). UBY-LMF conforms to the ISO standard for lexicons: LMF, designed within the ISO-TC37, and constitutes a so-called serialization of this abstract standard. In accordance with the LMF, all attributes and other linguistic terms introduced in UBY-LMF refer to standardized descriptions of their meaning in ISOCat.

UBY-LMF has been implemented in Java and is actively developed as an Open Source project on Google Code. Based on this Java implementation, the large scale electronic lexicon UBY has automatically been created - it is the result of using UBY-LMF to standardize a range of diverse lexical resources frequently used for NLP applications.

In 2013, UBY contains 10 lexicons which are pairwise interlinked at the sense level:

- English WordNet, Wiktionary, Wikipedia, FrameNet, VerbNet, OmegaWiki
- German Wiktionary, Wikipedia, GermaNet, IMSLex-Subcat and
- multilingual OmegaWiki.

A subset of lexicons integrated in UBY have been converted to a Semantic Web format according to the lemon lexicon model. This conversion is based on a mapping of UBY-LMF to the lemon lexicon model.
