= BabelNet =

Multilingual lexical-semantic knowledge graph and encyclopedic dictionary

- Stable release: BabelNet 6.0 / November 2026
- Operating system: Virtuoso Universal Server; Lucene
- Type: Multilingual encyclopedic dictionary; Linked data
- License: Attribution-NonCommercial-ShareAlike 3.0 Unported
- Website: babelnet.org

BabelNet is a multilingual lexical-semantic knowledge graph, ontology and encyclopedic dictionary developed at the NLP group of the Sapienza University of Rome under the supervision of Roberto Navigli. BabelNet was automatically created by linking Wikipedia to the most popular computational lexicon of the English language, WordNet. The integration is done using an automatic mapping and by filling in lexical gaps in resource-poor languages by using statistical machine translation. The result is an encyclopedic dictionary that provides concepts and named entities lexicalized in many languages and connected with large amounts of semantic relations. Additional lexicalizations and definitions are added by linking to free-license wordnets, OmegaWiki, the English Wiktionary, Wikidata, FrameNet, VerbNet, GeoNames, and others. Similarly to WordNet, BabelNet groups words in different languages into sets of synonyms, called Babel synsets. For each Babel synset, BabelNet provides definitions (called glosses) in many languages harvested from all the resources it integrates as well as usage examples and, where available, associated images.

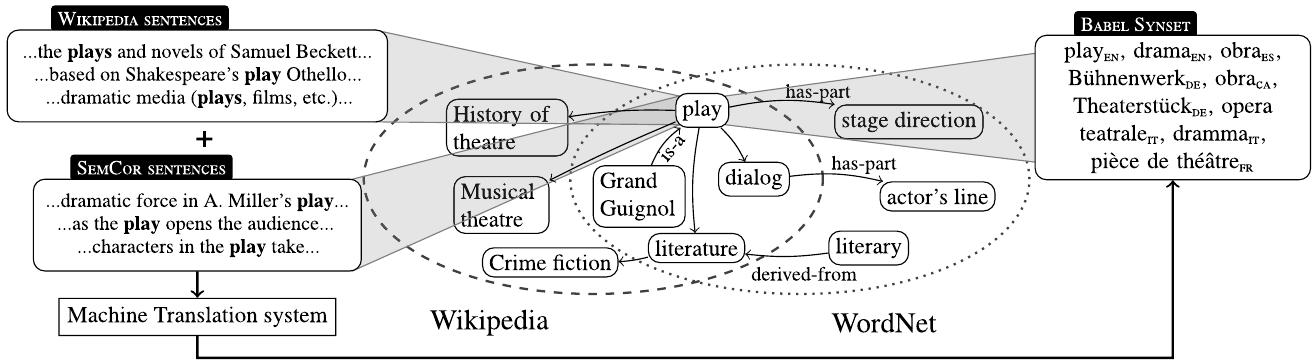
BabelNet is a multilingual semantic network obtained as an integration of WordNet and Wikipedia.

== Statistics of BabelNet ==
As of November 2026, BabelNet (version 6.0) covers 3,086 languages, compared to 600 in the previous version 5.3. It contains 21.5 million synsets and 15.8 billion word senses, i.e., associations between words or expressions and their corresponding synsets in a given language. The resource also includes around 270 million definitions and 492,580 usage examples.

Version 6.0 integrates updated 2026 data from Wikipedia, Wikidata, Wiktionary, GeoNames, and the 2025 release of Open English WordNet. The mappings between BabelNet synsets and entries in all the resources have been revised. The filtering of Wikipedia disambiguation pages, list pages and redirects to other projects has also been refined, along with the assignment of domain labels.

The knowledge graph includes all the lexico-semantic relations from WordNet (hypernymy and hyponymy, meronymy and holonymy, antonymy and synonymy, etc., totaling around 364,000 relation edges) as well as an underspecified relatedness relation from Wikipedia, together with more specific relations from Wikidata, totaling approximately 2.1 billion semantic relations.

To expand definition coverage, version 6.0 employs a large language model-assisted pipeline to extract definitions from Wikipedia, incorporating automatic checks against the source text and targeted corrections. A separate pipeline uses large language models to translate WordNet definitions into multiple languages. The release also includes around 35 million updated images associated with Babel synsets, sourced from Wikipedia and Wikidata, with improved filtering of uninformative images. In addition, manually created illustrations have been added for approximately 3,000 verbal synsets.

BabelNet has also been made available in the Lemon RDF format, accessible through a SPARQL endpoint. Approximately 2.67 million synsets are assigned domain labels.

== Applications ==
BabelNet has been used to support and enable multilinguality in a wide range of natural language processing applications, including:

- Semantic relatedness,
- Multilingual word-sense disambiguation and entity linking, with the Babelfy system,
- Video games with a purpose.
- Semantic role labeling, through VerbAtlas, a lexical-semantic resource constructed by grouping BabelNet verbal synsets into semantically coherent frames and associating them with semantic roles.
- Machine translation evaluation, through DiBiMT, a benchmark that uses BabelNet synsets to annotate the meanings of ambiguous words and assess how machine translation systems handle lexical ambiguity.
- Multimodal learning, through BabelPic, a dataset based on BabelNet image-synset associations and designed to support the visual representation of non-concrete concepts.

== Prizes and acknowledgments ==
BabelNet received the META prize 2015 for "groundbreaking work in overcoming language barriers through a multilingual lexicalised semantic network and ontology making use of heterogeneous data sources".

The Artificial Intelligence Journal paper that describes BabelNet won the Prominent Paper Award in 2017.

BabelNet featured prominently in a Time magazine article about the new age of innovative and up-to-date lexical knowledge resources available on the Web.

== See also ==
- Babelfy
- EuroWordNet
- Knowledge acquisition
- Linguistic Linked Open Data
- Semantic network
- Semantic relatedness
- Wikidata
- Wiktionary
- Word sense disambiguation
- Word sense induction
- UBY
