= LRE Map =

Freely accessible large database

The LRE Map (Language Resources and Evaluation) is a freely accessible large database on resources dedicated to Natural language processing. The original feature of LRE Map is that the records are collected during the submission of different major Natural language processing conferences. The records are then cleaned and gathered into a global database called "LRE Map".

The LRE Map is intended to be an instrument for collecting information about language resources and to become, at the same time, a community for users, a place to share and discover resources, discuss opinions, provide feedback, discover new trends, etc. It is an instrument for discovering, searching and documenting language resources, here intended in a broad sense, as both data and tools.

The large amount of information contained in the Map can be analyzed in many different ways. For instance, the LRE Map can provide information about the most frequent type of resource, the most represented language, the applications for which resources are used or are being developed, the proportion of new resources vs. already existing ones, or the way in which resources are distributed to the community.

== Context ==
Several institutions worldwide maintain catalogues of language resources (ELRA, LDC, NICT Universal Catalogue, ACL Data and Code Repository, OLAC, LT World, etc.) However, it has been estimated that only 10% of existing resources are known, either through distribution catalogues or via direct publicity by providers (web sites and the like). The rest remains hidden, the only occasions where it briefly emerges being when a resource is presented in the context of a research paper or report at some conference. Even in this case, nevertheless, it might be that a resource remains in the background simply because the focus of the research is not on the resource per se.

== History ==
The LRE Map originated under the name "LREC Map" during the preparation of LREC 2010 conference. More specifically, the idea was discussed within the FlaReNet project, and in collaboration with ELRA and the Institute of Computational Linguistics of CNR in Pisa, the Map was put in place at LREC 2010. The LREC organizers asked the authors to provide some basic information about all the resources (in a broad sense, i.e. including tools, standards and evaluation packages), either used or created, described in their papers. All these descriptors were then gathered in a global matrix called the LREC Map.

The same methodology and requirements from the authors has been then applied and extended to other conferences, namely COLING-2010, EMNLP-2010, RANLP-2011, LREC 2012, LREC 2014 and LREC 2016.
After this generalization to other conferences, the LREC Map has been renamed as the LRE Map.

== Size and content ==
The size of the database increases over time. The data collected amount to 4776 entries.

Each resource is described according to the following attributes:

- Resource type, e.g. lexicon, annotation tool, tagger/parser.
- Resource production status, e.g. newly created finished, existing-updated.
- Resource availability, e.g. freely available, from data center.
- Resource modality, e.g. speech, written, sign language.
- Resource use, e.g. named entity recognition, language identification, machine translation.
- Resource language, e.g. English, 23 European Union languages, official languages of India.

== Uses ==
The LRE map is a very important tool to chart the NLP field. Compared to other studied based on subjective scorings, the LRE map is made of real facts.

The map has a great potential for many uses, in addition to being an information gathering tool:

- It is a great instrument for monitoring the evolution of the field (useful for funders), if applied in different contexts and times.
- It can be seen as a huge joint effort, the beginning of an even larger cooperative action not just among few leaders but among all the researchers.
- It is also an "educational" means towards the broad acknowledgment of the need of meta-research activities with the active involvement of many.
- It is also instrumental in introducing the new notion of "citation of resources" that could provide an award and a means of scholarly recognition for researchers engaged in resource creation.
- It is used to help the organization of the conferences of the field like LREC.

== Derived matrices ==
The data were then cleaned and sorted by Joseph Mariani (CNRS-LIMSI IMMI) and Gil Francopoulo (CNRS-LIMSI IMMI + Tagmatica) in order to compute the various matrices of the final FLaReNet reports. One of them, the matrix for written data at LREC 2010 is as follows:

	Corpus	Lexicon	Ontology	Grammar/Language Model	Terminology
Bulgarian	7	6	1	1	1
Czech	12	7	2	1	1
Danish	6	2	0	2	0
Dutch	17	8	2	1	2
English	206	77	18	11	10
Estonian	3	1	0	0	1
Finnish	3	2	0	1	0
French	44	24	3	4	5
German	43	15	4	2	3
Greek	10	3	2	0	0
Hungarian	8	4	0	1	1
Irish	1	0	0	0	0
Italian	32	16	4	2	0
Latvian	9	0	0	0	1
Lithuanian	4	0	2	0	1
Maltese	1	0	0	1	0
Polish	7	2	1	2	1
Portuguese	19	6	1	1	0
Romanian	12	7	1	1	0
Slovak	2	0	0	1	0
Slovene	5	1	0	0	0
Spanish	29	19	4	5	2
Swedish	19	4	0	1	0
Other Europe	19	11	3	3	2
Regional Europe	18	8	0	1	3
Multilingual	5	3	1	0	1
Language independent	9	3	16	2	1
Non applicable	2	0	2	1	0
Total	552	229	67	45	36

English is the most studied language. Secondly, come French and German languages and then Italian and Spanish.

== Future ==
The LRE Map has been extended to Language Resources and Evaluation Journal and other conferences.
