= Martine Adda-Decker =

French computer scientist (born 1960)

Martine Adda-Decker (born 1960) is a French computer scientist and speech processing researcher. She is a director of research for the French National Centre for Scientific Research (CNRS), affiliated with the Laboratoire de Phonétique et Phonologie of CNRS and the Sorbonne Nouvelle University.

Adda-Decker defended her doctorate in 1988 through Paris-Sud University, with the dissertation Évaluation d'unités de décision pour la reconnaissance de la parole continue directed by Joseph Mariani.

Adda-Decker was recognized as a Fellow of the International Speech Communication Association in 2019, "for contributions to multilingual speech processing and large-scale, corpus-based linguistics, and for bridging communities". She was president of the Association Francophone de la Communication Parlée from 2021 until 2025.
