= CLARIN =

European research consortium

Common Language Resources and Technology Infrastructure
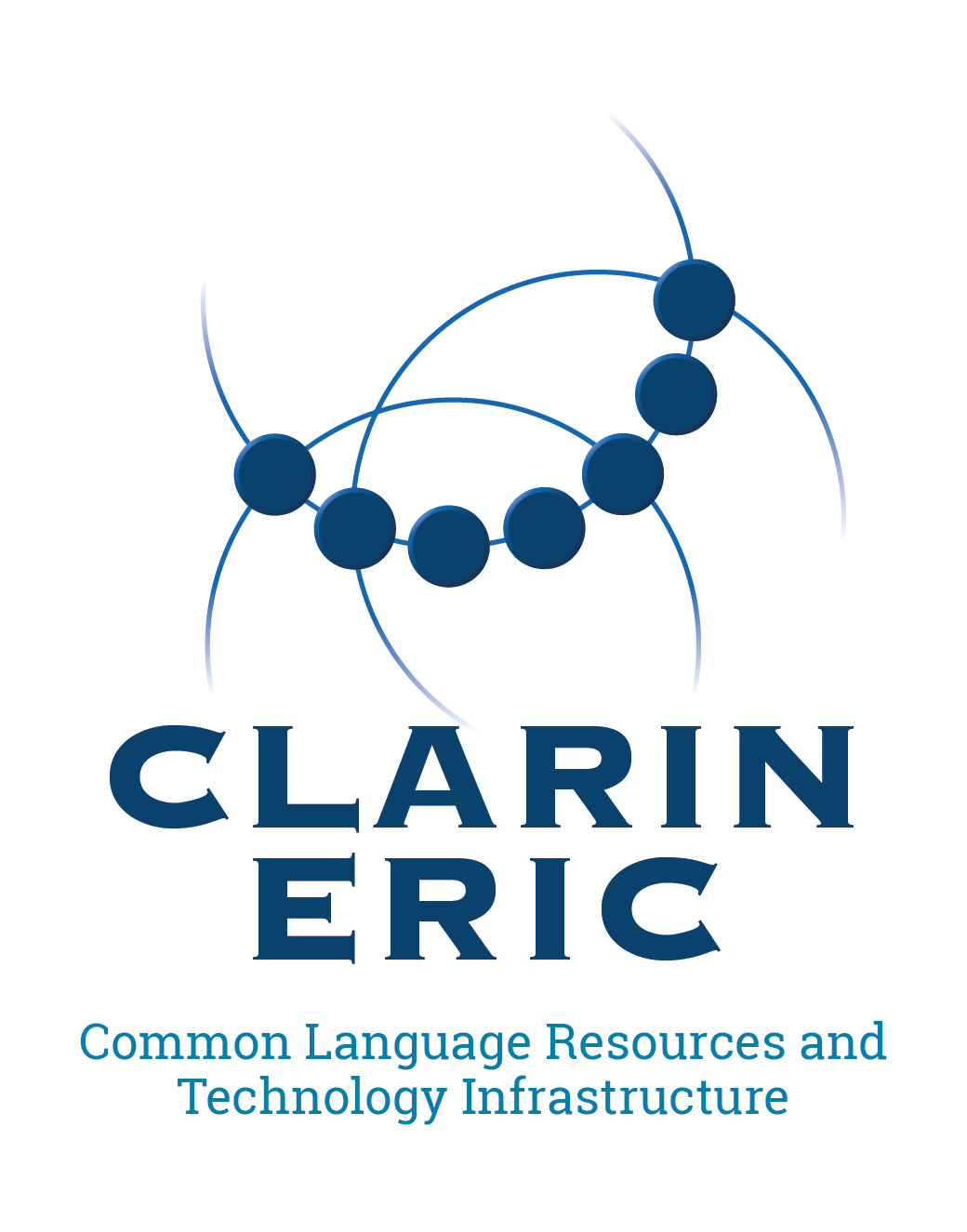
- CLARIN ERIC logo
- Abbreviation: CLARIN
- Formation: 2012-02-29
- Type: ERIC, IGO
- Headquarters: Utrecht, Netherlands
- Region served: Europe and beyond
- Members: Member countries: Austria, Belgium, Bulgaria, Cyprus, Czech Republic, Croatia, Denmark, Estonia, Finland, Germany, Greece, Hungary, Iceland, Italy, Latvia, Lithuania, Netherlands, Norway, Poland, Portugal, Slovenia, Slovak Republic, South Africa, Spain, Sweden, Switzerland, United Kingdom.
- Official language: English
- Executive Director: Darja Fišer
- Main organ: General Assembly, board of directors, National Coordinators Forum
- Website: www.clarin.eu

Common Language Resources and Technology Infrastructure (CLARIN ERIC) is a European Research Infrastructure Consortium founded in 2012. It comprises national consortia in and outside the European Union, consisting of institutes such as universities, research centres, libraries and public archives. The goal of the consortium is providing access to digital language data collections, to digital tools, and training material for researchers to work with the language resources.

== Objectives ==
The goal of CLARIN is to make various digital language resources and tools from all over Europe and beyond accessible through a single sign-on online environment for the support of researchers in the humanities and social sciences and to support scholars who want to engage in data-driven research, contributing to a multilingual European Research Area. CLARIN is one of the research infrastructures selected for the European Research Infrastructures Roadmap by ESFRI the European Strategy Forum on Research Infrastructures. In the 2016 ESFRI Roadmap CLARIN was listed as a landmark.

One of the missions of the CLARIN Knowledge Infrastructure is to ensure that the knowledge and expertise available throughout the CLARIN infrastructure is accessible in an organised way, easy to navigate for the CLARIN community and for the Social Sciences and Humanities research community at large. A cornerstone of the CLARIN knowledge sharing ecosystem are the Knowledge Centres, institutions with expertise in one or more aspects of the domain covered by the CLARIN community.

== Services and resources ==
CLARIN offers a wide range of services, some of which are integrated in the European Open Science Cloud (EOSC). They include:

- Virtual Language Observatory (VLO); a search and discovery interface for a large number of resources.
- The Language Resource Switchboard; a tool that for finding a matching language processing web application for one's data.
- Depositing Services; for storing resources.

Some of the resources accessible through CLARIN infrastructure include:

- Endangered Languages Archive
- Oxford Text Archive
- PlWordNet

== Governance ==
The General Assembly represents the members of CLARIN ERIC and is the highest decision-making body of CLARIN ERIC. It is assisted by an international Scientific Advisory Board. The day-to-day management is in the hands of the board of directors chaired by the Executive Director Darja Fišer and supported by the CLARIN Central Hub.

The largest effort towards the further integration of data, tools and expertise stems from the activities in the national consortia. The National Coordinators’ Forum is responsible for the coordination of the collaboration across countries.

== Membership ==
The majority of operations, services and centres of the CLARIN infrastructure is provided and funded by the CLARIN ERIC membership (member, observers and linked third parties). Members and observers can be countries or intergovernmental organisations. They set up a national consortium, typically consisting of universities, research institutions, libraries and public archives).

Below is the list of current CLARIN ERIC members, observers and third parties:

| Members | National Consortia (NC) |
|---|---|
| Austria | Digital Humanities Austria |
| Belgium | CLARIN-BE |
| Bulgaria | CLaDA-BG |
| Croatia | HR-CLARIN |
| Cyprus | CLARIN-CY |
| Czech Republic | LINDAT/CLARIAH-CZ |
| Denmark | CLARIN-DK |
| Estonia | CLARIN Estonia |
| Finland | FIN-CLARIN |
| Germany | CLARIN-D |
| Greece | clarin:el |
| Hungary | HunCLARIN |
| Iceland | CLARIN Iceland |
| Italy | CLARIN-IT |
| Latvia | CLARIN-LV |
| Lithuania | CLARIN-LT |
| The Netherlands | CLARIAH-NL |
| Norway | CLARINO |
| Poland | CLARIN PL |
| Portugal | PORTULAN CLARIN |
| Slovenia | CLARIN.SI |
| Slovak Republic | CLARIN-SK |
| South Africa | SADiLaR |
| Spain | CLARIAH-ES |
| Sweden | SWE-CLARIN |
| Switzerland | CLARIN-CH |
| United Kingdom | CLARIN-UK |
