= Multilingual notation =

Computational linguistics

A multilingual notation is a representational system designed to encode, describe, or annotate information in a way that is usable across multiple natural languages without being tied to any single one. It is especially relevant in fields like computational linguistics, lexicography, and knowledge representation.

== UML diagrams ==
For instance, within LMF, a multilingual notation could be as presented in the following diagram, for English / French translation. In this diagram, two intermediate SenseAxis instances are used in order to represent a near match between fleuve in French and river in English. The SenseAxis instance on the bottom is not linked directly to any English sense because this notion does not exist in English.

A more complex situation is when more than two languages are concerned, as in the following diagram dealing with English, Italian and Spanish.

== Number of languages considerations ==
Within the context of a multilingual database comprising more than two languages, usually the multilingual notations are factorized, in order to save the number of links. In other terms, the multilingual notations are interlingual nodes that are shared among the language descriptions.

But in the specific context of a lexical resource that is a bilingual lexicon, the term bilingual link is usually preferred.

== Other terminology ==
Instead of translation (which has a rather broad meaning), some authors prefer equivalence between words, with different notions like dynamic and formal equivalences.

== Context of use ==
This term is mainly used in the context of Machine translation and Natural language processing lexicons. The term is not used in the context of translation dictionary that concerns mainly hand-held electronic translators.

== See also ==
- lexical markup framework
