= ELAN software =

Audio and video recording software

ELAN
- Developer: The Language Archive
- Release: 2000; 26 years ago
- Stable release: 6.1 / March 12, 2021; 5 years ago
- Written in: Java
- Operating system: Windows, macOS, Linux
- Platform: IA-32, x86-64
- Available in: English
- Type: Language documentation, qualitative data analysis
- License: GPLv3
- Website: archive.mpi.nl/tla/elan

ELAN is computer software, a professional tool to manually and semi-automatically annotate and transcribe audio or video recordings. It has a tier-based data model that supports multi-level, multi-participant annotation of time-based media. It is applied in humanities and social sciences research (language documentation, sign language and gesture research) for the purpose of documentation and of qualitative and quantitative analysis. It is distributed as free and open source software under the GNU General Public License, version 3.

ELAN is a well established professional-grade software and is widely used in academia. It has been well received in several academic disciplines, for example, in psychology, medicine, psychiatry, education, and behavioral studies, on topics such as human computer interaction, sign language and conversation analysis, group interactions, music therapy, bilingualism and child language acquisition, analysis of non-verbal communication and gesture analysis, and animal behavior.

Several third-party tools have been developed to enrich and analyse ELAN data and corpora.

== Features ==
Its features include:

- Manual and semi-automatic segmentation and annotation
- Transcription and translation of speech
- Tier hierarchies
- Support for multiple media sources
- Use of controlled vocabularies
- Complex search
- XML-based data format

== History ==
ELAN is developed by the Max Planck Institute for Psycholinguistics in Nijmegen. The first version was released around the year 2000 under the name EAT, Eudico Annotation Tool. It was renamed to ELAN in 2002. Since then, two to three new versions are released each year. It is developed in the programming language Java with interfaces to platform native media frameworks developed in C, C++, and Objective-C.

== See also ==
- Computer-assisted qualitative data analysis software
- Language documentation
- Language documentation tools and methods

== Notes ==
- Crasborn, O., Sloetjes, H. (2008). Enhanced ELAN functionality for sign language corpora. In: Proceedings of LREC 2008, Sixth International Conference on Language Resources and Evaluation.
- Lausberg, H.; Sloetjes, H. (2016). "The revised NEUROGES-ELAN system: An objective and reliable interdisciplinary analysis tool for nonverbal behavior and gesture" (PDF). Behavior Research Methods. 48 (3): 973–993. doi:10.3758/s13428-015-0622-z. PMID 26428913. S2CID 29805533.
