= Morphological pattern =

Set of operations that build forms of lexemes

A morphological pattern is a set of associations and/or operations that build the various forms of a lexeme, possibly by inflection, agglutination, compounding or derivation. The term is used in the domain of lexicons and morphology.

== Note ==
It is important to distinguish the paradigm of a lexeme from a morphological pattern. In the context of an inflecting language, a morphological pattern usually references a prototypical class of inflectional forms, e.g. ring as per sing. In contrast, the paradigm of a lexeme is the explicit list of the inflected forms of the given lexeme (e.g. to ring, rang, rung). Said in other terms, this is the difference between a description in intension (a morphological pattern) and a description in extension (a paradigm).

== See also ==
- Lexical markup framework
- Morphology (linguistics)
- Word formation

== Sources ==
- Aronoff, Mark (1993). "Morphology by Itself". Cambridge, MA: MIT Press.
- Comrie, Bernard. (1989). Language Universals and Linguistic Typology; 2nd ed. Chicago: University of Chicago Press. ISBN 0-226-11433-3 (pbk).
- Matthews, Peter. (1991). Morphology; 2nd ed. Cambridge: Cambridge University Press. ISBN 0-521-41043-6 (hb). ISBN 0-521-42256-6 (pbk).
- Mel'čuk, Igor A. (1993-2000). Cours de morphologie générale, vol. 1-5. Montreal: Presses de l'Université de Montréal.
- Stump, Gregory T. (2001). Inflectional Morphology: a theory of paradigm structure. (Cambridge Studies in Linguistics; no. 93.) Cambridge: Cambridge University Press. ISBN 0-521-78047-0 (hbk).
