= EuroWordNet =

Multilingual lexical database based on WordNet

EuroWordNet (EWN) was a European research project to build a multilingual database of wordnets for several European languages. Each language has its own wordnet structured along the same lines as the Princeton WordNet, with synsets linked by semantic relations. The wordnets are interconnected through an Interlingual Index (ILI) that maps language-specific synsets to a shared set of concepts, enabling cross-lingual queries and applications.

The project was managed by Piek Vossen at the University of Amsterdam and ran in two phases funded by the European Commission: LE-2 (1996–1999) and LE-4 (1997–1999).

== Languages ==
The first phase (LE-2) produced wordnets for Dutch, Italian, Spanish, and English. The second phase (LE-4) extended coverage to German, French, Czech, and Estonian. These wordnets are now frozen, but they served as a model for subsequent wordnet projects in other languages.

== Interlingual Index ==
The central innovation of EuroWordNet is the Interlingual Index, a structured set of concepts to which all language-specific synsets are linked. Rather than directly mapping words between languages, each wordnet maps its synsets to ILI records, which in turn reference Princeton WordNet synsets. This allows any two languages to be connected indirectly through the shared index, without requiring bilingual resources for every language pair.

The ILI approach was later continued by the Global WordNet Association (GWA), which Vossen co-founded. The GWA maintains the Collaborative InterLingual Index (CILI), an open repository that provides persistent URIs for interlingual concepts mapped to Princeton WordNet, enabling wordnets worldwide to interlink through a common conceptual layer.

== License ==
Some examples of EuroWordNet data are available for free. Access to the full database, however, is charged. In some cases, OpenThesaurus and BabelNet may serve as free alternatives.

== See also ==
- WordNet
- BabelNet
- OpenThesaurus
- Linguistic Linked Open Data
