= La Vortaro =

Esperanto dictionary

- Vortaro logo

- Screenshot of Vortaro
- Original author: Bernard Vivier (based in the FREELANG Dictionary)
- Initial release: 2001
- Stable release: 3.6 / 2005
- Written in: C++
- Platform: Microsoft Windows and Linux
- Available in: Esperanto
- Type: Dictionary
- License: Collaborative
- Website: la-vortaro.net

La Vortaro (The Dictionary) is an Esperanto dictionary, created by Bernard Vivier.

La Vortaro is partner of the FREELANG Dictionary project with more than 130 languages with a free software for utilization.

== Dictionary modules ==
Like the FREELANG dictionary, various language modules make up the core of the La Vortaro dictionary. Language modules may be accessed through the off-line FREELANG/La Vortaro dictionary program. The off-line dictionary program is currently available only for Microsoft Windows.

Available in Esperanto

- Afrikaans
- Basque
- Bosnian
- Catalan
- Croatian
- Czech
- Danish
- Dutch
- Dutch (Suriname)
- English
- Finnish
- French
- West Frisian
- German
- Hungarian
- Irish
- Icelandic
- Italian
- Latin
- Luxembourgish
- Norwegian
- Polish
- Portuguese (Brazilian)
- Serbian
- Slovak
- Spanish
- Swedish
- Ukrainian

== See also ==
- Freelang
