= Language documentation tools and methods =

The field of language documentation in the modern context involves a complex and ever-evolving set of tools and methods, and the study and development of their use – and, especially, identification and promotion of best practices – can be considered a sub-field of language documentation proper. Among these are ethical and recording principles, workflows and methods, hardware tools, and software tools.

== Principles and workflows ==
Researchers in language documentation often conduct linguistic fieldwork to gather the data on which their work is based, recording audiovisual files that document language use in traditional contexts. Because the environments in which linguistic fieldwork often takes place may be logistically challenging, not every type of recording tool is necessary or ideal, and compromises must often be struck between quality, cost and usability. It is also important to envision one's complete workflow and intended outcomes; for example, if video files are made, some amount of processing may be required to expose the audio component to processing in various ways by different software packages.

=== Ethics ===
Ethical practices in language documentation have been the focus of much recent discussion and debate. The Linguistic Society of America has prepared an Ethics Statement, and maintains an Ethics Discussion Blog which is primarily focused on ethics in the language documentation context. The First Peoples' Cultural Council and Endangered Languages Project have released a Linguist's Code of Conduct for engaging in documentation work. The morality of ethics protocols has itself been brought into question by George van Driem. Most postgraduate programs that involve some form of language documentation and description require researchers to submit their proposed protocols to an internal Institutional Review Board which ensures that research is being conducted ethically. Minimally, participants should be informed of the process and the intended use of the recordings, and give recorded audible or written permission for the audiovisual materials to be used for linguistic investigation by the researcher(s). Many participants will want to be named as consultants, but others will not - this will determine whether the data needs to be anonymized or restricted from public access.

=== Data Formats ===
Adhering to standards for formats is critical for interoperability between software tools. Many individual archives or data repositories have their own standards and requirements for data deposited on their servers - knowledge of these requirements ought to inform the data collection strategy and tools used, and should be part of a data management plan developed before the start of research. Some example guidelines from well-used repositories are given below:

- Endangered Languages Archive (ELAR) guidelines
- Max Planck Institute Archive accepted formats
- Yale University Library audiovisual guidelines

Most current archive standards for video use MPEG-4 (H264) as an encoding or storage format, which includes an AAC audio stream (generally of up to 320 kbit/s). Audio archive quality is at least WAV 44.1 kHz, 16-bit.

=== Principles for recording ===
Since documentation of languages is often difficult, with many languages that linguists work with being endangered (they may not be spoken in the near future), it is recommended to record at the highest quality possible given the limitations of a recorder. For video, this means recording at HD resolution (1080p or 720p) or higher when possible, while for audio this means recording minimally in uncompressed PCM 44,100 samples per second, 16-bit resolution. Arguably, however, good recording techniques (isolation, microphone selection and usage, using a tripod to minimize blur) is more important than resolution. A microphone that gives a clear recording of a speaker telling a folktale (high signal/noise ratio) in MP3 format (perhaps via a phone) is better than an extremely noisy recording in WAV format where all that can be heard are cars going by. To ensure that good recordings can be obtained, linguists should practice with their recording devices as much as possible and compare the results to observe which techniques yield the best results.

=== Workflows ===
For many linguists the end-result of making recordings is language analysis, often investigation of a language's phonological or syntactic properties using various software tools. This requires transcription of the audio, generally in collaboration with native speakers of the language in question. For general transcription, media files can be played back on a computer (or other device capable of playback) and paused for transcription in a text editor. Other (cross-platform) tools to assist this process include Audacity and Transcriber, while a program like ELAN (described further below) can also perform this function.

Programs like Toolbox or FLEx are often preferred by linguists who want to be able to interlinearize their texts, as these programs build a dictionary of forms and parsing rules to help speed up analysis. Unfortunately, media files are generally not linked by these programs (as opposed to ELAN, in which linked files are preferred), making it difficult to view or listen back to recordings to check transcriptions. There is currently a workaround for Toolbox that allows timecodes to reference an audio file and enable playback (of a complete text or a referenced sentence) from within Toolbox - in this workflow, time-alignment of text is performed in Transcriber, and then the relevant timecodes and text are converted into a format that Toolbox can read.

== Hardware ==
=== Video+audio recorders ===
Recorders that record video typically also record audio as well. However, the audio does not always meet the criteria of minimal needs and recommended best practices for language documentation (uncompressed WAV format, 44.1 kHz, 16-bit), and is often not useful for linguistic purposes such as phonetic analysis. Many video devices record instead to a compressed audio format such as AAC or MP3, which is combined with the video stream in a wrapper of various kinds. Exceptions to this general rule are the following Video+Audio recorders:

The Zoom series, particularly the Q8, Q4n, and Q2n, which record to multiple video and audio resolutions/formats, most notably WAV (44.1/48/96 kHz, 16/24-bit).

When using a video recorder that does not record audio in WAV format (such as most DSLR cameras), it is recommended to record audio separately on another recorder, following some of the guidelines below. As with the audio recorders described below, many video recorders also accept microphone input of various kinds (generally through an 1/8-inch or TRS connector) - this can ensure a high-quality backup audio recording that is in sync with the recorded video, which can be helpful in some cases (i.e. for transcription).

=== Audio recorders and microphones ===
Audio-only recorders can be used in scenarios where video is impractical or otherwise undesirable. In most cases it is advantageous to combine the use of an audio-only recorder with one or more external microphones, however many modern audio recorders include built-in microphones which are usable if cost or setup speed are important concerns. Digital (solid state) recorders are preferred for most language documentation scenarios. Modern digital recorders achieve a very high level of quality at a relatively low price. Some of the most popular field recorders are found in the Zoom range, including the H1, H2, H4, H5 and H6. The H1 is particularly suitable for situations in which cost and user-friendliness are major desiderata. Other popular recorders for situations where size is a factor are the Olympus LS-series and the Sony Digital Voice recorders (though in the latter case, ensure that the device can record to WAV/Linear PCM format).

Several types of microphone can be effectively used in language documentation scenarios, depending on the situation (especially, including factors such as number, position and mobility of speakers) and on budget. In general, condenser microphones should be selected rather than dynamic microphones. It is an advantage in most fieldwork situations if a condenser microphone is self-powered (via a battery); however, when power is not a major factor, phantom-powered models can also be used. A stereo microphone setup is needed whenever more than one speaker is involved in a recording; this can be achieved via an array of two mono microphones, or by a dedicated stereo microphone.

Directional microphones should be used in most cases, in order to isolate a speaker's voice from other potential noise sources. However, omnidirectional microphones may be preferred in situations involving larger numbers of speakers arrayed in a relatively large space. Among directional microphones, cardioid microphones are suitable for most applications, however in some cases a hypercardioid ("shotgun") microphone may be preferred.

Good quality headset microphones are comparatively expensive, but can produce recordings of extremely high quality in controlled situations. Lavalier or "lapel" microphones may be used in some situations, however, depending on the microphone they can produce recordings which are inferior to a headset microphone for phonetic analysis, and are subject to some of the same concerns that headset microphones are in terms of restriction of a recording to a single speaker - while other speakers may be audible on the recording, they will be backgrounded in relation to the speaker wearing the lavalier microphone.

Some good quality microphones used for film-making and interviews include the Røde VideoMic shotgun and the Røde lavalier series, Shure headworn mics and Shure lavaliers. Depending on the recorder and microphone, additional cables (XLR, stereo/mono converter or a TRRS to TRS adapter) will be necessary.

== Software ==
There is as yet no single software suite which is designed to or able to handle all aspects of a typical language documentation workflow. Instead, there is a large and increasing number of packages designed to handle various aspects of the workflow, many of which overlap considerably. Some of these packages use standard formats and are inter-operable, whereas others are much less so.

=== SayMore ===
SayMore is a language documentation package developed by SIL International in Dallas which primarily focuses on the initial stages in language documentation, and aims for a relatively uncomplicated user experience.

The primary functions of SayMore are: (a) audio recording (b) file import from recording device (video and/or audio) (c) file organization (d) metadata entry at session and file levels (e) association of AV files with evidence of informed consent and other supplementary objects (such as photographs) (f) AV file segmentation (g) transcription/translation (h) BOLD-style Careful Speech annotation and Oral Translation.

SayMore files can be further exported for annotation in FLEx, and metadata can be exported in .csv and IMDI formats for archiving.

=== ELAN ===
ELAN is developed by The Language Archive at the Max Planck Institute for Psycholinguistics in Nijmegen. ELAN is a full-featured transcription tool, particularly useful for researchers with complex annotation needs/goals.

=== FLEx ===
FieldWorks Language Explorer, FLEx is developed by SIL International formerly Summer Institute of Linguistics, Inc. at SIL International in Dallas. FLEx allows the user to build a "lexicon" of the language, i.e. a word-list with definitions and grammatical information, and also to store texts from the language. Within the texts, each word or part of a word (i.e. a "morpheme") is linked to an entry in the lexicon. For new projects and for students learning for the first time, FLEx is now the best tool for interlinearising and dictionary-making.

=== Toolbox ===
Field Linguist's Toolbox (usually called Toolbox) is a precursor of FLEx and has been one of the most widely used language documentation packages for some decades. Previously known as Shoebox, Toolbox's primary functions are construction of a lexical database, and interlinearization of texts through interaction with the lexical database. Both lexical database and texts can be exported to a word processing environment, in the case of the lexical database using the Multi-Dictionary Formatter (MDF) conversion tool. It is also possible to use Toolbox as a transcription environment. By comparison with ELAN and FLEx, Toolbox has relatively limited functionality, and is felt by some to have an unintuitive design and interface. However, a large number of projects have been carried-out in the Shoebox/Toolbox environment over its lifespan, and its user base continues to enjoy its advantages of familiarity, speed, and community support. Toolbox also has the advantage of working directly with human-readable text files that can be opened in any text editor and easily manipulated and archived. Toolbox files can also be easily converted for storage in XML (recommended for archives), such as with open source Python libraries like Xigt intended for computational uses of IGT data.

=== Tools for automating components of the workflow ===
Language documentation may be partially automated thanks to a number of software tools, including:

- eSpeak
- HTK
- Lingua Libre, a libre online tool allowing to record a large number of words and phrases in a short period (up to 1 000 words/hour with a clean word list and an experienced user). It automatizes the classic procedure for recording audio and video pronunciation files (for spoken and signed languages). Once the recording is done, the platform automatically uploads clean, well cut, well named and apps-friendly files, directly to Wikimedia Commons (it is possible to download datasets for a specific language).
- Maus
- Prosodylab Aligner
- Sox

== Literature ==
The peer-reviewed journal Language Documentation and Conservation has published a large number of articles focusing on tools and methods in language documentation.

== Film ==
The 2021 Indian documentary film Dreaming of Words traces the life and work of Njattyela Sreedharan, a fourth standard drop-out, who compiles a multilingual dictionary connecting four major Dravidian languages Malayalam, Kannada, Tamil and Telugu. Travelling across four states and doing extensive research, he spent twenty five years making this multilingual dictionary.

== See also ==
LRE Map Language resources map Searchable by Resource Type, Language(s), Language type, Modality, Resource Use, Availability, Production Status, Conference(s), Resource name

Richard Littauer's GitHub catalog A catalog of "open-source code that would be useful for documenting, conserving, developing, preserving, or working with endangered languages".

RNLD software page Research Network for Linguistic Diversity's page on linguistic software.
