= Babelfy =

Software algorithm for the disambiguation of text

- Developers: Andrea Moro, Alessandro Raganato, Roberto Navigli
- Stable release: Babelfy 1.0 / June 2014
- Type: Word sense disambiguation; Entity linking
- License: Attribution-NonCommercial-ShareAlike 3.0 Unported
- Website: babelfy.org

Babelfy is a software algorithm for the disambiguation of text written in any language. It performs the tasks of multilingual Word Sense Disambiguation (i.e., the disambiguation of common nouns, verbs, adjectives and adverbs) and Entity Linking (i.e. the disambiguation of mentions to encyclopedic entities like people, companies, places, etc.).

== Overview ==
Babelfy uses the BabelNet multilingual knowledge graph to perform disambiguation and entity linking in three steps:

- It associates with each vertex of the BabelNet semantic network, i.e., either concept or named entity, a semantic signature, that is, a set of related vertices. This is a preliminary step which needs to be performed only once, independently of the input text.
- Given an input text, it extracts all the linkable fragments from this text and, for each of them, lists the possible meanings according to the semantic network.
- It creates a graph-based semantic interpretation of the whole text by linking the candidate meanings of the extracted fragments using the previously computed semantic signatures. It then extracts a dense subgraph of this representation and selects the best candidate meaning for each fragment.

As a result, the text, written in any of the 271 languages supported by BabelNet, is output with possibly overlapping semantic annotations.

== See also ==
- BabelNet
- Entity linking
- Multilinguality
- Word sense disambiguation
