= GNU Collaborative International Dictionary of English =

- Original author: Patrick J. Cassidy
- Developers: Patrick J. Cassidy, Sergey Poznyakoff
- Stable release: 0.54 / 31 December 2024; 20 months ago
- License: GNU General Public License
- Website: gcide.gnu.org.ua
- Repository: git.savannah.gnu.org/cgit/gcide.git

The GNU Collaborative International Dictionary of English (GCIDE) is a free electronic dictionary derived from the 1913 edition of Webster's Revised Unabridged Dictionary, supplemented with some definitions from WordNet. The dictionary is released under the GNU General Public License.

It describes itself as "a freely-available set of ASCII files containing the marked-up text of a substantial English dictionary". It is made available as a potential starting point for development of a modern comprehensive encyclopedic dictionary, to be accessible freely on the Internet, and developed by the efforts of all individuals willing to help build a large and freely available knowledge base.

== History ==
The initial digitized 1913 Webster's Dictionary (without WordNet definitions) was hosted by Project Gutenberg (in the etext96 directory).

Sometime in the first half of 1999, the Free Software Foundation began hosting Cassidy's dictionary project.

== See also ==
- GNU Aspell, a spellchecker
- DICT, a protocol for dictionary access
