= OpenThesaurus =

OpenThesaurus is a multilingual thesaurus project built in open collaboration by volunteers. Its data is freely available as open content. It is known for its usage in the applications OpenOffice.org, LibreOffice, KWord, Lyx, and Apple Dictionary.

== Contents ==
The database takes words that are associated with at least one meaning. Apart from synonyms, it also contains some taxonomic relations. There is a German, a Dutch, a Norwegian, a Polish, a Portuguese, a Slovak, a Slovenian, a Spanish and a Greek version available. The German version has over 280,000 synonyms.

=== Access and editing ===
The data is freely available under the terms of the GNU Lesser General Public License (LGPL). The database can be searched online without login through a web frontend on the website. Apart from that the data is also available in formats for use with the word processors of the office suites LibreOffice and OpenOffice.org (Writer) or as a complete database dump. With a free account users that are logged in can also add and alter entries. All entries have to be checked at least once before a release is made.

== History ==
The cause for the start of the project was the arrival of OpenOffice.org in 2002, which was missing the thesaurus of its parent, StarOffice, due to its licensing. OpenThesaurus filled that gap by importing possible synonyms from a freely available German/English dictionary and refining and updating these in crowdsourced work through the use of a web application.

Since version 2.0.3 OpenOffice.org innately ships with OpenThesaurus. The project has gained a lot of popularity following the arrival of Apple Dictionary in Mac OS X 10.5, which can integrate OpenThesaurus data through a plugin.

== Literature ==
- Christian M. Meyer, Iryna Gurevych (March 2010), "Worth Its Weight in Gold or Yet Another Resourcee — A Comparative Study of Wiktionary, OpenThesaurus and GermaNet" (PDF), Computational Linguistics and Intelligent Text Processing, Lecture Notes in Computer Science, vol. 6008, Berlin, Heidelberg: Springer-Verlag, pp. 38–49, doi:10.1007/978-3-642-12116-6_4, ISBN 978-3-642-12115-9, archived from the original (PDF) on 2017-12-01
- Naber D. OpenThesaurus: Building a Thesaurus with a Web Community. 2004.
- Daniel Naber (March 2005), "OpenThesaurus — Ein offenes deutsches Wortnetz" (PDF), Sprachtechnologie, mobile Kommunikation und linguistische Ressourcen: Beiträge zur GLDV-Tagung 2005 in Bonn, Frankfurt: Peter-Lang-Verlag, pp. 422–433
