= Machine-readable postal marking =

Machine-readable postal marking may refer to:

- POSTNET, Postal Numeric Encoding Technique, which encodes ZIP codes, ZIP+4 codes and (optionally) delivery points
- Postal Alpha Numeric Encoding Technique, PLANET, barcode used by the U.S. Postal Service
- Facing Identification Mark, a bar code designed by the U.S. Postal Service
- Intelligent Mail barcode, replaces POSTNET and PLANET
- Identification Code Tracking
