= IMDI =

IMDI (ISLE Meta Data Initiative) is a metadata standard to describe multi-media and multi-modal language resources. The standard provides interoperability for browsable and searchable corpus structures and resource descriptions with help of specific tools. The project is partly based on existing conventions and standards in the Language Resource community.

The web-based Browsable Corpus at the Max Planck Institute for Psycholinguistics allows you to browse through IMDI corpora and search for language resources.
