= StarDict =

Free software multilingual dictionary

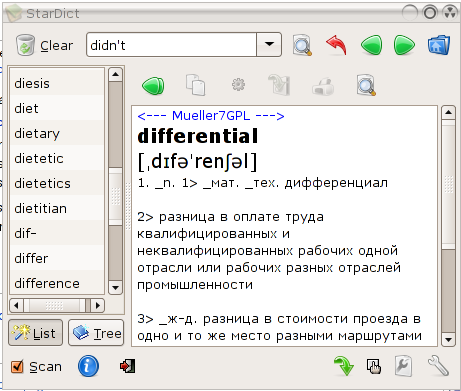
- StarDict screenshot
- Release: March 10, 2003; 23 years ago
- Stable release: 3.0.7.1 / 2 October 2023
- Written in: C++
- Operating system: Cross-platform
- Type: Dictionary
- License: GPL-3.0-or-later
- Website: stardict-4.sourceforge.net
- Repository: github.com/huzheng001/stardict-3

StarDict, developed by Hu Zheng (胡正), is a free GUI released under the GPL-3.0-or-later license for accessing StarDict dictionary files (a dictionary shell). It is the successor of StarDic, developed by Ma Su'an (馬蘇安), continuing its version numbers.

According to StarDict's earlier homepage on SourceForge, the project has been removed from SourceForge due to copyright infringement reports. It moved to Google Code and then back to SourceForge, while development is now seemingly continued on GitHub.

== Supported platforms ==
StarDict runs under Linux, Windows, FreeBSD, Maemo and Solaris. Dictionaries of the user's choice are installed separately. Dictionary files can be created by converting dict files.

Several programs compatible with the StarDict dictionary format are available for different platforms. For the iPhone, iPod Touch and iPad, applications available in the App Store include GuruDic, TouchDict, weDict, Dictionary Universal, Alpus and others, as well as the free iStarDict, which is available for the Cydia Store.

== Dictionaries available ==
One can find here the partial list of FreeDict dictionaries which can be converted to the StarDict format. These include, in particular, some older versions of Webster's dictionary and many dictionaries for various languages.

== Features ==
While StarDict is in scan mode, results are displayed in a tooltip, allowing easy dictionary lookup. When combined with Freedict, StarDict will quickly provide rough translations of foreign language websites.

On September 25, 2006, an online version of Stardict began operation. This online version includes access to all the major dictionaries of StarDict, as well as Wikipedia in Chinese.

Previous versions of StarDict were very similar to the PowerWord dictionary program, which is developed by a Chinese company, KingSoft. Since version 2.4.2, however, StarDict has diverged from the design of PowerWord by increasing its search capabilities and adding lexicons in a variety of languages. This was assisted by the collaboration of many developers with the author.

== sdcv ==
sdcv
- Developers: Evgeniy A. Dushistov, Hu Zheng
- Stable release: 3.0.7.1 / 2 October 2023; 3 years ago
- Written in: C++
- Operating system: Cross-platform
- License: GNU General Public License v3.0 or later
- Website: http://www.huzheng.org/stardict.org_web
- Repository: github.com/huzheng001/stardict-3

Evgeniy A. Dushistov produced a command line version of StarDict called sdcv. It employed all the dictionary files that belong to StarDict. It is written in C++ and licensed under the terms of the GNU General Public License.

sdcv runs under Linux, FreeBSD, and Solaris. As in StarDict, dictionaries of the user's choice have to be installed separately.

At the end of 2006, software developer Hu Zheng cited personal financial problems as an excuse to charge users for downloading dictionary files from his website, which temporarily aroused strong doubts and dissatisfaction in the Linux community. In the end, under the pressure of public opinion, the charging plan was forced to be canceled and ended hastily.

== See also ==
- Machine translation
