= OLAC =

OLAC, the Open Language Archives Community, is an initiative to create a unified means of searching online databases of language resources for linguistic research and other purposes. The information about resources is stored in XML format for easy searching. OLAC was founded in 2000. It was hosted at the Linguistic Data Consortium webserver at the University of Pennsylvania until 2026, when the hosting was moved to the University of Cologne.

OLAC advises on best practices in language archiving, and works to promote interoperation between language archives.

== Metadata ==
The OLAC metadata set is based on the complete set of Dublin Core metadata terms (DCMT), but the format allows for the use of extensions to express community-specific qualifiers. It is often contrasted to IMDI (ISLE Metadata Initiative).

=== Attributes ===
The OLAC metadata is based on five primary attributes, refine, code, scheme, lang, and langs, although the last attribute is only for completed metadata sets. Each attribute serves a different function and is applicable in a different section of the metadata.

Table 1: Attributes and Their Functions
Attribute	Function
Refine	qualifying the meaning of certain elements, reducing the element to a "particular controlled vocabulary or notation"
Code	"holding metadata values from a specific encoding scheme"
Scheme	standardizes how "the text in the content of the element will be encoded"
Lang	provides the name of the language that is in the text
Langs	provides the name of the language that "the metadata record is designed to be read" in

=== Elements ===
There are currently 23 different elements that OLAC lists on its metadata page. Elements may be used more than once, and not every element is required in a metadata submission. Each element's entry on the official OLAC page includes the name of the element, its function, notes on its usage, and examples of its coding.

In addition, OLAC provides a list of metadata extensions to augment descriptions.
