= FREELANG Dictionary =

Bilingual dictionary for Microsoft Windows

- Freelang logo

- Freelang screenshot Freelang website screenshot Screenshot of FREELANG and Screenshot of the website of FREELANG
- Original author: Beaumont
- Developer: LingvoSoft Inc.
- Release: 1997
- Stable release: 4.3 / July 23, 2015; 11 years ago
- Written in: C++
- Platform: Microsoft Windows, Pocket PC, Palm OS and smartphones
- Available in: English, Spanish, Esperanto, French, Swedish, etc.
- Type: Dictionary
- License: Collaborative
- Website: freelang.net

FREELANG is a bilingual and free dictionary for Microsoft Windows. Founded in 1997 by Beaumont, FREELANG is free to download (freeware) but is under copyright of the authors, and it is collaborative.

== History ==
FREELANG Dictionary has its roots in the Dutch Dictionary Project, started in 1996 by Frits van Zanten and his friend Tom van der Meijden. The project initially consisted of electronic wordlists from Dutch to other languages, but with a team of volunteers around the world, they started to build websites to distribute the program and some word lists based on their language expertise. In August 1997, the French version was hosted under the name of FREELANG, headed by the French Dutch Dictionary Project lead, Beaumont.

From 1998 to 2000, Frits and Tom progressively stepped out of the project. By the summer of 1998, the Dutch Dictionary Project team consisted of six members—Dario (Italy), Peter (Sweden), Vladimir (Russia), Tom (Norway), Gustaf (Denmark) and Beaumont (France)—who decided to continue with the venture. Vladimir, the Russian Dutch Dictionary Project lead, wrote new scripts to simplify the creation of new dictionaries. The Translation Help Service was created, offering free translations' courtesy of a growing team of volunteer translators. In October 2001, both the English and Dutch versions of the Dutch Dictionary Project were brought under FREELANG. The current FREELANG site is managed by Beaumont, based in Bangkok, Thailand since October 2002. In April 2003, the Spanish version was brought under FREELANG. In a major website restructuring in May 2009, English, French, German, Italian, Lithuanian, Russian, Spanish and Thai welcome pages were added, providing a portal to access the English, French and Spanish FREELANG sites.

== Language platform ==
The FREELANG operates four separate language websites: English, Dutch, French and Spanish.

Its fellow Dutch Dictionary Project versions include sites in Czech, Esperanto, Italian and Russian. At the height of the Dutch Dictionary Project, sites in Danish, German, Hungarian, Norwegian, Polish, Brazilian Portuguese and Swedish also existed.

== Services ==
=== Dictionary ===
Various language modules make up the core of the FREELANG dictionary. Language modules may be accessed through either the on-line interface page or off-line FREELANG dictionary program. While the on-line interface page accommodates all platforms, the off-line dictionary program to access the modules is currently available only for Microsoft Windows. The software is available in English (en), French (fr), Dutch (nl) or Spanish (es).

=== Translations ===
FREELANG Translation Help Service provides some translation services for free, as long as is not too long and not for a commercial purpose. The service is accessed through a request form and a volunteer translator replies via e-mail.

== See also ==
- La Vortaro
- Wikipedia
