= VerbNet =

Lexical database

The VerbNet project maps PropBank verb types to their corresponding Levin classes. It is a lexical resource that incorporates both semantic and syntactic information about its contents.

VerbNet is part of the SemLink project in development at the University of Colorado.

== Related projects ==
- UBY, a database of 10 resources including VerbNet.
