= International Conference on Language Resources and Evaluation =

Biannual event on natural language processing

LREC
- Company type: Conference
- Key people: Nicoletta Calzolari, Conference Chair
- Website: www.lrec-conf.org

The International Conference on Language Resources and Evaluation is an international conference organised by the ELRA Language Resources Association every other year (on even years) with the support of institutions and organisations involved in Natural language processing. The series of LREC conferences was launched in Granada in 1998.

== History of conferences ==
The survey of the LREC conferences over the period 1998-2013 was presented during the 2014 conference in Reykjavik as a closing session. It appears that the number of papers and signatures is increasing over time. The average number of authors per paper is higher as well. The percentage of new authors is between 68% and 78%. The distribution between male (65%) and female (35%) authors is stable over time. The most frequent technical term is "annotation", then comes "part-of-speech".

== The LRE Map ==
The LRE Map was introduced at LREC 2010 and is now a regular feature of the LREC submission process for both the conference papers and the workshop papers. At the submission stage, the authors are asked to provide some basic information about all the resources (in a broad sense, i.e. including tools, standards and evaluation packages), either used or created, described in their papers. All these descriptors are then gathered in a global matrix called the LRE Map. This feature has been extended to several other conferences.
