= Troponymy =

Manner relation between lexemes

In linguistics, troponymy is the presence of a 'manner' relation between two lexemes.

The concept was originally proposed by Christiane Fellbaum and George Miller. Some examples they gave are "to nibble is to eat in a certain manner, and to gorge is to eat in a different manner. Similarly, to traipse or to mince is to walk in some manner".

Troponymy is one of the possible relations between verbs in the semantic network of the WordNet database.

== See also ==
- Hyponymy and hypernymy
- Hierarchy § Subsumptive containment hierarchy
- Is-a
  - Hypernymy (and supertype)
  - Hyponymy (and subtype)
- Has-a
  - Holonymy
  - Meronymy
- Lexical chain
- Ontology (information science)
- Polysemy
- Semantic primes
- Semantic satiation
- Thematic role
- Word sense
- Word sense disambiguation
