= Lexical semantics =

Subfield of linguistic semantics

Lexical semantics (also known as lexicosemantics), as a subfield of linguistic semantics, is the study of word meanings. It includes the study of how words structure their meaning, how they act in grammar and compositionality, and the relationships between the distinct senses and uses of a word.

The units of analysis in lexical semantics are lexical units which include not only words but also sub-words or sub-units such as affixes and even compound words and phrases. Lexical units include the catalogue of words in a language, the lexicon. Lexical semantics looks at how the meaning of the lexical units correlates with the structure of the language or syntax. This is referred to as syntax–semantics interface.

The study of lexical semantics concerns:

- the classification and decomposition of lexical items
- the differences and similarities in lexical semantic structure cross-linguistically
- the relationship of lexical meaning to sentence meaning and syntax.

Lexical units, also referred to as syntactic atoms, can be independent such as in the case of root words or parts of compound words or they require association with other units, as prefixes and suffixes do. The former are termed free morphemes and the latter bound morphemes. They fall into a narrow range of meanings (semantic fields) and can combine with each other to generate new denotations.

Cognitive semantics is the linguistic paradigm/framework that since the 1980s has generated the most studies in lexical semantics, introducing innovations like prototype theory, conceptual metaphors, and frame semantics.

== Lexical relations ==
Lexical items contain information about category (lexical and syntactic), form and meaning. The semantics related to these categories then relate to each lexical item in the lexicon. Lexical items can also be semantically classified based on whether their meanings are derived from single lexical units or from their surrounding environment.

Lexical items participate in regular patterns of association with each other. Some relations between lexical items include hyponymy, hypernymy, synonymy, and antonymy, as well as homonymy.

=== Hyponymy and hypernymy ===
Hyponymy and hypernymy refer to a relationship between a general term and the more specific terms that fall under the category of the general term.

For example, the colors red, green, blue and yellow are hyponyms. They fall under the general term of color, which is the hypernym.

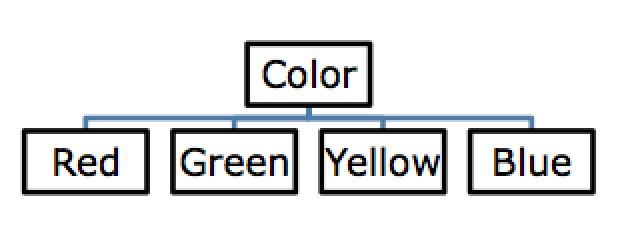
Taxonomy showing the hypernym "color"

Color (hypernym) → red, green, yellow, blue (hyponyms)

Hyponyms and hypernyms can be described by using a taxonomy, as seen in the example.

=== Synonym ===
Synonym refers to words that are pronounced and spelled differently but contain the same meaning.

Happy, joyful, glad[6]

=== Antonym ===
Antonym refers to words that are related by having the opposite meanings to each other. There are three types of antonyms: graded antonyms, complementary antonyms, and relational antonyms.

Sleep, awake[6]
long, short

=== Homonymy ===
Homonymy refers to the relationship between words that are spelled or pronounced the same way but hold different meanings.

bank (of river)
bank (financial institution)

=== Polysemy ===
Polysemy refers to a word having two or more related meanings.

bright (shining)
bright (intelligent)

An example of a semantic network

=== Semantic networks ===
Lexical semantics also explores whether the meaning of a lexical unit is established by looking at its neighbourhood in the semantic network, (words it occurs with in natural sentences), or whether the meaning is already locally contained in the lexical unit.

In English, WordNet is an example of a semantic network. It contains English words that are grouped into synsets. Some semantic relations between these synsets are meronymy, hyponymy, synonymy, and antonymy.

== Semantic fields ==
=== How lexical items map onto concepts ===
First proposed by Trier in the 1930s, semantic field theory proposes that a group of words with interrelated meanings can be categorized under a larger conceptual domain. This entire entity is thereby known as a semantic field. The words boil, bake, fry, and roast, for example, would fall under the larger semantic category of cooking. Semantic field theory asserts that lexical meaning cannot be fully understood by looking at a word in isolation, but by looking at a group of semantically related words. Semantic relations can refer to any relationship in meaning between lexemes, including synonymy (big and large), antonymy (big and small), hypernymy and hyponymy (rose and flower), converseness (buy and sell), and incompatibility. Semantic field theory does not have concrete guidelines that determine the extent of semantic relations between lexemes. The abstract validity of the theory is a subject of debate.

Knowing the meaning of a lexical item therefore means knowing the semantic entailments the word brings with it. However, it is also possible to understand only one word of a semantic field without understanding other related words. Take, for example, a taxonomy of plants and animals: it is possible to understand the words rose and rabbit without knowing what a marigold or a muskrat is. This is applicable to colors as well, such as understanding the word red without knowing the meaning of scarlet, but understanding scarlet without knowing the meaning of red may be less likely. A semantic field can thus be very large or very small, depending on the level of contrast being made between lexical items. While cat and dog both fall under the larger semantic field of animal, including the breed of dog, like German shepherd, would require contrasts between other breeds of dog (e.g. corgi, or poodle), thus expanding the semantic field further.

=== How lexical items map onto events ===
Event structure is defined as the semantic relation of a verb and its syntactic properties. Event structure has three primary components:

- primitive event type of the lexical item
- event composition rules
- mapping rules to lexical structure

Verbs can belong to one of three types: states, processes, or transitions.

(1) a. The door is closed.[12]
b. The door closed.
c. John closed the door.

(1a) defines the state of the door being closed; there is no opposition in this predicate. (1b) and (1c) both have predicates showing transitions of the door going from being implicitly open to closed. (1b) gives the intransitive use of the verb close, with no explicit mention of the causer, but (1c) makes explicit mention of the agent involved in the action.

== History of syntactic basis of event structure ==
=== Generative semantics in the 1960s ===
The analysis of these different lexical units had a decisive role in the field of "generative linguistics" during the 1960s. The term generative was proposed by Noam Chomsky in his book Syntactic Structures published in 1957. The term generative linguistics was based on Chomsky's generative grammar, a linguistic theory that states systematic sets of rules (X' theory)can predict grammatical phrases within a natural language. Generative Linguistics is also known as Government-Binding Theory. Generative linguists of the 1960s, including Noam Chomsky and Ernst von Glasersfeld, believed semantic relations between transitive verbs and intransitive verbs were tied to their independent syntactic organization. This meant that they saw a simple verb phrase as encompassing a more complex syntactic structure.

=== Lexicalist theories in the 1980s ===
Lexicalist theories became popular during the 1980s, and emphasized that a word's internal structure was a question of morphology and not of syntax. Lexicalist theories emphasized that complex words (resulting from compounding and derivation of affixes) have lexical entries that are derived from morphology, rather than resulting from overlapping syntactic and phonological properties, as Generative Linguistics predicts. The distinction between Generative Linguistics and Lexicalist theories can be illustrated by considering the transformation of the word destroy to destruction:

- Generative Linguistics theory: states the transformation of destroy → destruction as the nominal, nom + destroy, combined with phonological rules that produce the output destruction. Views this transformation as independent of the morphology.
- Lexicalist theory: sees destroy and destruction as having idiosyncratic lexical entries based on their differences in morphology. Argues that each morpheme contributes specific meaning. States that the formation of the complex word destruction is accounted for by a set of Lexical Rules, which are different and independent from syntactic rules.

A lexical entry lists the basic properties of either the whole word, or the individual properties of the morphemes that make up the word itself. The properties of lexical items include their category selection c-selection, selectional properties s-selection, (also known as semantic selection), phonological properties, and features. The properties of lexical items are idiosyncratic, unpredictable, and contain specific information about the lexical items that they describe.

The following is an example of a lexical entry for the verb put:

put: V DPagent DPexperiencer/PPlocative

Lexicalist theories state that a word's meaning is derived from its morphology or a speaker's lexicon, and not its syntax. The degree of morphology's influence on overall grammar remains controversial. Currently, the linguists that perceive one engine driving both morphological items and syntactic items are in the majority.

=== Micro-syntactic theories: 1990s to the present ===
By the early 1990s, Chomsky's minimalist framework on language structure led to sophisticated probing techniques for investigating languages. These probing techniques analyzed negative data over prescriptive grammars, and because of Chomsky's proposed Extended Projection Principle in 1986, probing techniques showed where specifiers of a sentence had moved to in order to fulfill the EPP. This allowed syntacticians to hypothesize that lexical items with complex syntactic features (such as ditransitive, inchoative, and causative verbs), could select their own specifier element within a syntax tree construction. (For more on probing techniques, see Suci, G., Gammon, P., & Gamlin, P. (1979)).

This brought the focus back on the syntax-lexical semantics interface; however, syntacticians still sought to understand the relationship between complex verbs and their related syntactic structure, and to what degree the syntax was projected from the lexicon, as the Lexicalist theories argued.

In the mid 1990s, linguists Heidi Harley, Samuel Jay Keyser, and Kenneth Hale addressed some of the implications posed by complex verbs and a lexically-derived syntax. Their proposals indicated that the predicates CAUSE and BECOME, referred to as subunits within a Verb Phrase, acted as a lexical semantic template. Predicates are verbs and state or affirm something about the subject of the sentence or the argument of the sentence. For example, the predicates went and is here below affirm the argument of the subject and the state of the subject respectively.

Lucy went home.
The parcel is here.

The subunits of Verb Phrases led to the Argument Structure Hypothesis and Verb Phrase Hypothesis, both outlined below. The recursion found under the "umbrella" Verb Phrase, the VP Shell, accommodated binary-branching theory; another critical topic during the 1990s. Current theory recognizes the predicate in Specifier position of a tree in inchoative/anticausative verbs (intransitive), or causative verbs (transitive) is what selects the theta role conjoined with a particular verb.

==== Hale & Keyser 1990 ====
Hale and Keyser 1990 structure

Kenneth Hale and Samuel Jay Keyser introduced their thesis on lexical argument structure during the early 1990s. They argue that a predicate's argument structure is represented in the syntax, and that the syntactic representation of the predicate is a lexical projection of its arguments. Thus, the structure of a predicate is strictly a lexical representation, where each phrasal head projects its argument onto a phrasal level within the syntax tree. The selection of this phrasal head is based on Chomsky's Empty Category Principle. This lexical projection of the predicate's argument onto the syntactic structure is the foundation for the Argument Structure Hypothesis. This idea coincides with Chomsky's Projection Principle, because it forces a VP to be selected locally and be selected by a Tense Phrase (TP).

Based on the interaction between lexical properties, locality, and the properties of the EPP (where a phrasal head selects another phrasal element locally), Hale and Keyser make the claim that the Specifier position or a complement are the only two semantic relations that project a predicate's argument. In 2003, Hale and Keyser put forward this hypothesis and argued that a lexical unit must have one or the other, Specifier or Complement, but cannot have both.

==== Halle & Marantz 1993 ====
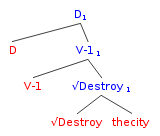
Halle & Marantz 1993 structure

Morris Halle and Alec Marantz introduced the notion of distributed morphology in 1993. This theory views the syntactic structure of words as a result of morphology and semantics, instead of the morpho-semantic interface being predicted by the syntax. Essentially, the idea that under the Extended Projection Principle there is a local boundary under which a special meaning occurs. This meaning can only occur if a head-projecting morpheme is present within the local domain of the syntactic structure. The following is an example of the tree structure proposed by distributed morphology for the sentence "John's destroying the city". Destroy is the root, V-1 represents verbalization, and D represents nominalization.

==== Ramchand 2008 ====
In her 2008 book, Verb Meaning and The Lexicon: A First-Phase Syntax, linguist Gillian Ramchand acknowledges the roles of lexical entries in the selection of complex verbs and their arguments. 'First-Phase' syntax proposes that event structure and event participants are directly represented in the syntax by means of binary branching. This branching ensures that the Specifier is consistently the subject, even when investigating the projection of a complex verb's lexical entry and its corresponding syntactic construction. This generalization is also present in Ramchand's theory that the complement of a head for a complex verb phrase must co-describe the verb's event.

Ramchand also introduced the concept of Homomorphic Unity, which refers to the structural synchronization between the head of a complex verb phrase and its complement. According to Ramchand, Homomorphic Unity is "when two event descriptors are syntactically Merged, the structure of the complement must unify with the structure of the head."

== Classification of event types ==
=== Intransitive verbs: unaccusative versus unergative ===
Underlying tree structure for (2a)

Underlying tree structure for (2b)

The unaccusative hypothesis was put forward by David Perlmutter in 1987, and describes how two classes of intransitive verbs have two different syntactic structures. These are unaccusative verbs and unergative verbs. These classes of verbs are defined by Perlmutter only in syntactic terms. They have the following structures underlyingly:

- unaccusative verb: __ [_{VP} V NP]
- unergative verb: NP [_{VP} V]

The following is an example from English:

(2) Unaccusative
a. Mary fell.[26]
Unergative
b. Mary worked.

In (2a) the verb underlyingly takes a direct object, while in (2b) the verb underlyingly takes a subject.

=== Transitivity alternations: the inchoative/causative alternation ===
The change-of-state property of Verb Phrases (VP) is a significant observation for the syntax of lexical semantics because it provides evidence that subunits are embedded in the VP structure, and that the meaning of the entire VP is influenced by this internal grammatical structure. (For example, the VP the vase broke carries a change-of-state meaning of the vase becoming broken, and thus has a silent BECOME subunit within its underlying structure.) There are two types of change-of-state predicates: inchoative and causative.

Inchoative verbs are intransitive, meaning that they occur without a direct object, and these verbs express that their subject has undergone a certain change of state. Inchoative verbs are also known as anticausative verbs. Causative verbs are transitive, meaning that they occur with a direct object, and they express that the subject causes a change of state in the object.

Linguist Martin Haspelmath classifies inchoative/causative verb pairs under three main categories: causative, anticausative, and non-directed alternations. Non-directed alternations are further subdivided into labile, equipollent, and suppletive alternations.

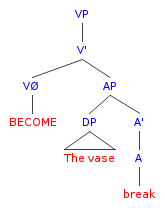
Underlying tree structure for (3a)

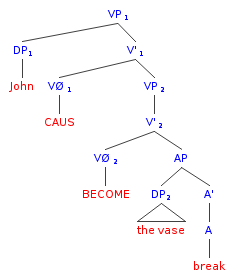
Underlying tree structure for (3b)

English tends to favour labile alternations, meaning that the same verb is used in the inchoative and causative forms. This can be seen in the following example: broke is an intransitive inchoative verb in (3a) and a transitive causative verb in (3b).

(3) English[27]
a. The vase broke.
b. John broke the vase.

As seen in the underlying tree structure for (3a), the silent subunit BECOME is embedded within the Verb Phrase (VP), resulting in the inchoative change-of-state meaning (y become z). In the underlying tree structure for (3b), the silent subunits CAUS and BECOME are both embedded within the VP, resulting in the causative change-of-state meaning (x cause y become z).

English change of state verbs are often de-adjectival, meaning that they are derived from adjectives. We can see this in the following example:

(4) a. The knot is loose.[30]
b. The knot loosened.
c. Sandy loosened the knot.

In example (4a) we start with a stative intransitive adjective, and derive (4b) where we see an intransitive inchoative verb. In (4c) we see a transitive causative verb.

==== Marked inchoatives ====
Some languages (e.g., German, Italian, and French), have multiple morphological classes of inchoative verbs. Generally speaking, these languages separate their inchoative verbs into three classes: verbs that are obligatorily unmarked (they are not marked with a reflexive pronoun, clitic, or affix), verbs that are optionally marked, and verbs that are obligatorily marked. The causative verbs in these languages remain unmarked. Haspelmath refers to this as the anticausative alternation.

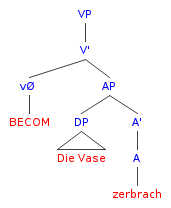
Underlying tree structure for (4a)

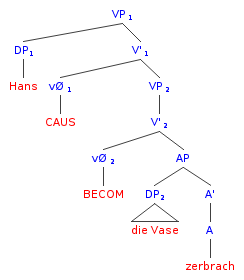
Underlying tree structure for (4b)

For example, inchoative verbs in German are classified into three morphological classes. Class A verbs necessarily form inchoatives with the reflexive pronoun sich, Class B verbs form inchoatives necessarily without the reflexive pronoun, and Class C verbs form inchoatives optionally with or without the reflexive pronoun. In example (5), the verb zerbrach is an unmarked inchoative verb from Class B, which also remains unmarked in its causative form.

German

Die Vase zerbrach.
the vase broke
'The vase broke.'

Hans zerbrach die Vase.
John broke the vase
'John broke the vase.'

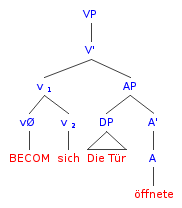
Underlying tree structure for (5a)

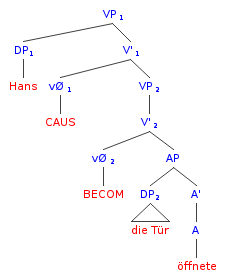
Underlying tree structure for (5b)

In contrast, the verb öffnete is a Class A verb which necessarily takes the reflexive pronoun sich in its inchoative form, but remains unmarked in its causative form.

German

Die Tür öffnete sich.
the door opened REFL
'The door opened.'

Hans öffnete die Tür.
John opened the door
'John opened the door.'

There has been some debate as to whether the different classes of inchoative verbs are purely based in morphology, or whether the differentiation is derived from the lexical-semantic properties of each individual verb. While this debate is still unresolved in languages such as Italian, French, and Greek, it has been suggested by linguist Florian Schäfer that there are semantic differences between marked and unmarked inchoatives in German. Specifically, that only unmarked inchoative verbs allow an unintentional causer reading (meaning that they can take on an "x unintentionally caused y" reading).

==== Marked causatives ====
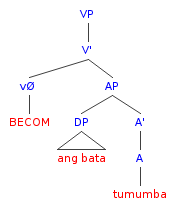
Underlying tree structure for (7a)

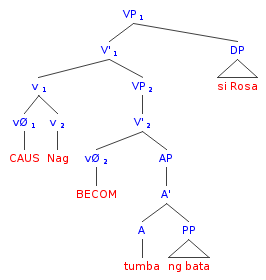
Underlying tree structure for (7b)

Causative morphemes are present in the verbs of many languages (e.g., Tagalog, Malagasy, Turkish, etc.), usually appearing in the form of an affix on the verb. This can be seen in the following examples from Tagalog, where the causative prefix pag- (realized here as nag) attaches to the verb tumba to derive a causative transitive verb in (7b), but the prefix does not appear in the inchoative intransitive verb in (7a). Haspelmath refers to this as the causative alternation.

Tagalog

Tumumba ang bata.
fell the child
'The child fell.'

Nagtumba ng bata si Rosa.
CAUS-fall of child DET Rosa
'Rosa knocked the child down.'

=== Ditransitive verbs ===
==== Kayne's 1981 unambiguous path analysis ====
Tree diagram (8a)

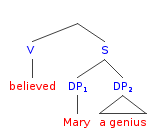
Tree diagram (8b)

Richard Kayne proposed the idea of unambiguous paths as an alternative to c-commanding relationships, which is the type of structure seen in examples (8). The idea of unambiguous paths stated that an antecedent and an anaphor should be connected via an unambiguous path. This means that the line connecting an antecedent and an anaphor cannot be broken by another argument. When applied to ditransitive verbs, this hypothesis introduces the structure in diagram (8a). In this tree structure it can be seen that the same path can be traced from either DP to the verb. Tree diagram (7b) illustrates this structure with an example from English. This analysis was a step toward binary branching trees, which was a theoretical change that was furthered by Larson's VP-shell analysis.

==== Larson's 1988 "VP-shell" analysis ====
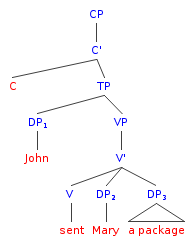
Tree diagram for (9a)

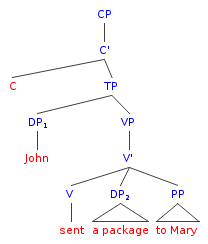
Tree diagram for (9b)

Larson posited his Single Complement Hypothesis in which he stated that every complement is introduced with one verb. The Double Object Construction presented in 1988 gave clear evidence of a hierarchical structure using asymmetrical binary branching. Sentences with double objects occur with ditransitive verbs, as we can see in the following example:

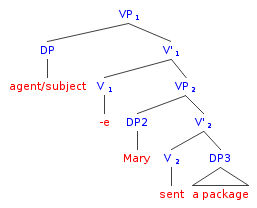
Larson's proposed binary-branching VP-shell structure for (9)

(9) a. John sent Mary a package.[34]
b. John sent a package to Mary.

It appears as if the verb send has two objects, or complements (arguments): both Mary, the recipient and parcel, the theme. The argument structure of ditransitive verb phrases is complex and has undergone different structural hypothesis.

The original structural hypothesis was that of ternary branching seen in (9a) and (9b), but following from Kayne's 1981 analysis, Larson maintained that each complement is introduced by a verb.

Their hypothesis shows that there is a lower verb embedded within a VP shell that combines with an upper verb (can be invisible), thus creating a VP shell (as seen in the tree diagram to the right). Most current theories no longer allow the ternary tree structure of (9a) and (9b), so the theme and the goal/recipient are seen in a hierarchical relationship within a binary branching structure.

Following are examples of Larson's tests to show that the hierarchical (superior) order of any two objects aligns with a linear order, so that the second is governed (c-commanded) by the first. This is in keeping with X'Bar Theory of Phrase Structure Grammar, with Larson's tree structure using the empty Verb to which the V is raised.

Reflexives and reciprocals (anaphors) show this relationship in which they must be c-commanded by their antecedents, such that the (10a) is grammatical but (10b) is not:

(10) a. I showed Mary herself.[33]
b. *I showed herself Mary.

A pronoun must have a quantifier as its antecedent:

(11) a.I gave every worker his paycheck.[33]
 b. *I gave its owner every paycheck.

Question words follow this order:

(12) a. Who did you give which paycheck?[33]
 b. *Which paycheck did you give who?

The effect of negative polarity means that "any" must have a negative quantifier as an antecedent:

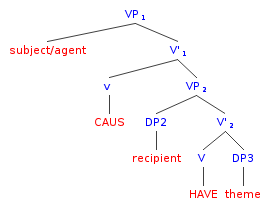
General tree diagram for Larson's proposed underlying structure of a sentence with causative meaning

(13) a. I showed no one anything.[33]
 b. *I showed anyone nothing.

These tests with ditransitive verbs that confirm c-command also confirm the presence of underlying or invisible causative verbs. In ditransitive verbs such as give someone something, send someone something, show someone something etc. there is an underlying causative meaning that is represented in the underlying structure. As seen in example in (9a) above, John sent Mary a package, there is the underlying meaning that 'John "caused" Mary to have a package'.

Larson proposed that both sentences in (9a) and (9b) share the same underlying structure and the difference on the surface lies in that the double object construction "John sent Mary a package" is derived by transformation from a NP plus PP construction "John sent a package to Mary".

==== Beck & Johnson's 2004 double object construction ====
Beck and Johnson, however, give evidence that the two underlying structures are not the same. In so doing, they also give further evidence of the presence of two VPs where the verb attaches to a causative verb. In examples (14a) and (b), each of the double object constructions are alternated with NP + PP constructions.

(14) a. Satoshi sent Tubingen the Damron Guide.[36]
 b. Satoshi sent the Damron Guide to Tübingen.

Beck and Johnson show that the object in (15a) has a different relation to the motion verb as it is not able to carry the meaning of HAVING which the possessor (9a) and (15a) can. In (15a), Satoshi is an animate possessor and so is caused to HAVE kisimen. The PP for Satoshi in (15b) is of a benefactive nature and does not necessarily carry this meaning of HAVE either.

(15) a. Thilo cooked Satoshi kisimen.[36]
 b. Thilo cooked kisimen for Satoshi.

The underlying structures are therefore not the same. The differences lie in the semantics and the syntax of the sentences, in contrast to the transformational theory of Larson. Further evidence for the structural existence of VP shells with an invisible verbal unit is given in the application of the adjunct or modifier "again". Sentence (16) is ambiguous and looking into the two different meanings reveals a difference in structure.

(16) Sally opened the door again.[36]

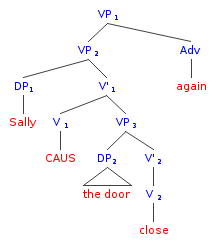
Underlying tree structure for (17a)

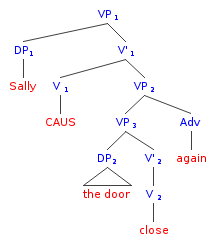
Underlying tree structure for (17b)

However, in (17a), it is clear that it was Sally who repeated the action of opening the door. In (17b), the event is in the door being opened and Sally may or may not have opened it previously. To render these two different meanings, "again" attaches to VPs in two different places, and thus describes two events with a purely structural change.

(17) a. Sally was so kind that she went out of her way to open the door
once again.[36]
 b. The doors had just been shut to keep out the bugs but Sally opened
the door again.

== Semasiology ==
Semasiology (from Greek: σημασία, semasia, "signification") is a discipline of linguistics concerned with the question "what does the word X mean?". It studies the meaning of words regardless how they are pronounced. It is the opposite of onomasiology, a branch of lexicology that starts with a concept or object and asks for its name, i.e., "how do you express X?" whereas semasiology starts with a word and asks for its meanings.

The exact meaning of semasiology is somewhat obscure. It is often used as a synonym of semantics. However, semasiology is also sometimes considered part of lexical semantics, a narrow subfield of lexicology (the study of words) and semantics. The term was first used in German by Christian Karl Reisig in 1825 in his work, [Lectures on Latin Linguistics] (German: Vorlesungen über lateinische Sprachwissenschaft), and was used in English by 1847. Semantics replaced it in its original meaning, beginning in 1893.

== See also ==
- Content word
- Lexical analysis
- Lexical chain
- Lexicalization
- Lexical markup framework
- Lexical verb
- Minimal recursion semantics
- Ontology
- Polysemy
- Semantic primes
- Semantic satiation
- SemEval
- Thematic role
- Troponymy
- Word sense
- Word-sense disambiguation
