= Malayalam WordNet =

- പദശൃംഖല
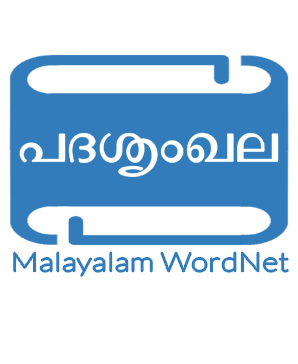
- MalayalamWordNet crest
- Official language: Malayalam
- Guide: Dr. Sumam Mary Idicula
- Key people: Varghese K. Aniyan, Drishya Gopinath, Dr. Sumam Mary Idicula
- Website: http://malayalamwordnet.cusat.ac.in

Malayalam WordNet (പദശൃംഖല) is an online WordNet created for Malayalam Language. Malayalam WordNet has been developed by the Department of Computer Science, Cochin University Of Science And Technology.

== History ==
The first WordNet to be created was the Princeton English WordNet. WordNet was created in the Cognitive Science Laboratory of Princeton University under the direction of professor G. A. Miller starting in 1985 . It was followed by EuroWordNet for European languages, based on Princeton WordNet. Hindi WordNet was the first Indian language WordNet to be created. It was developed by the Natural Language Processing group at the Center for Indian Language Technology. It was followed by IndoWordNet which was developed for 18 Indian Languages under the guidance of Dr. Pushpak Bhattacharya, Indian Institute of Technology Bombay. A WordNet for Malayalam language was developed as part of the IndoWordNet under the guidance of Dr. K.P. Soman and Dr. S. Rajendran at Amrita Vishwa Vidyapeetham, Coimbatore.

== Features ==
Malayalam WordNet is a crowd sourced project. IndoWordNet is publicly browsable, but it is not available to edit. Malayalam WordNet allows users to add data to the WordNet in a controlled crowd sourcing manner. Either a set of experts or users itself could review the entries added by other members which helps in maintaining consistent data throughout.

It also has a JSON and XML interfaces which helps the programmers to interact with the WordNet. It would be highly useful for the researchers, language experts as well as application developers.

== Team Members ==
Malayalam WordNet has been developed by the Department of Computer Science, Cochin University Of Science And Technology. The team is headed by Dr. Sumam Mary Idicula (Professor and Head, Department of Computer Science). The team also includes Drishya Gopinath and Varghese K. Aniyan

== Relationships covered ==
It gives information about the meaning of the word, position in ontology, an example sentence for the synset and the following relationships:

- Synsets/ Synonyms
- Hyponymy and hypernymy
- Holonymy
- Meronymy
- Antonyms

== Release ==
The alpha version was launched on February 1, 2016. The final version was released in April 2016.
