= Contrast set =

Collection of related items in a schema or ontology

A contrast set is a bounded collection of items, each of which could fill the same slot in a given schema, syntactic structure, or other linguistic environment. The seven days of the week, the fifty United States, the eight Hawaiian islands, the letters in the alphabet, the categories "male" and "female," the students in a class, or the flavors on offer at an ice cream store are all examples of contrast sets.

Contrast sets may be relatively natural in origin (such as the eight Hawaiian islands) or relatively conventional (such as the fifty United States). The mastery of certain conventional contrast sets is essential to basic socialization: for example, calendrical units, musical notes, and elements of writing systems like numerals and the alphabet. These contrast sets frequently become the subject of synesthesias or ideasthesias.

Semantic relations that form or represent contrast sets include cohyponymy (for example, major categories of trees include pine, elm, willow, maple, and so on) and comeronymy (for example, major components of a motor vehicle include an engine or motor, a transmission, one or more batteries, a set of wheels and tires, and so on).

Linguistic anthropologists Harold Conklin and Charles Frake were the first to work out the concept of the contrast set in the 1950s, and the concept was described in detail in Frake's article "The ethnographic study of cognitive systems."

Knowledge representation and reasoning aims to allow information technology to recognize and make use of the meaning and interrelationships of contrast sets. For example, ontology components for ontologies, as well as graph databases, are tools to help with that goal.

== JSON Schema ==
Can be defined in JSON schema using the "enum" keyword.

{
  "$schema": "https://json-schema.org/draft/2020-12/schema",
  "type": "object",
  "properties": {
    "color": {
      "type": "string",
      "enum": ["red", "green", "blue"]
    }
  },
  "required": ["color"]
}
