= WordNet =

Computational lexicon of English

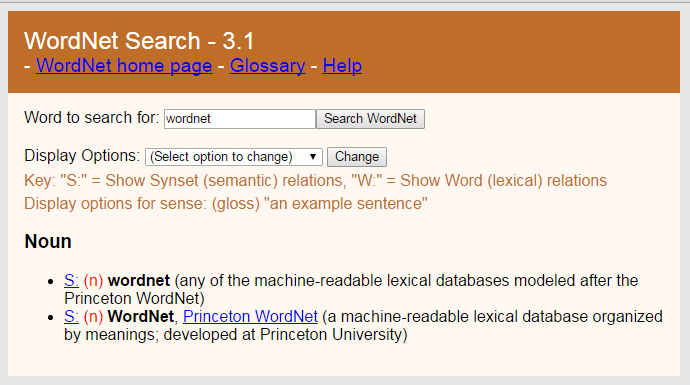
- A snapshot of WordNet's definition of itself
- Original author: George Armitage Miller
- Developer: Princeton University
- Release: 1985
- Stable release: 2025 Edition / 31 December 2025; 10 months ago
- Written in: Prolog
- Operating system: Unix, Linux, Solaris, Windows
- Size: 37 MB (including 161,705 words organized in 120,630 synsets for a total of 418,168 word-sense pairs)
- Available in: More than 200 languages
- Type: Lexical database
- Licence: BSD-like
- Website: wordnet.princeton.edu en-word.net
- Repository: https://github.com/globalwordnet/english-wordnet

WordNet is a lexical database of semantic relations between words that links words into semantic relations including synonyms, hyponyms, and meronyms. The synonyms are grouped into synsets with short definitions and usage examples. It can thus be seen as a combination and extension of a dictionary and thesaurus. Its primary use is in automatic text analysis and artificial intelligence applications. It was first created in the English language and the English WordNet database and software tools have been released under a BSD style license and are freely available for download.

As of 2026, the project is no longer being developed. The online version is no longer available. Previous versions of the website described funding and staffing issues.

There are several community-led projects actively maintaining a version of the dataset. Some efforts recognized by the project include the Open English Wordnet and the Global WordNet Association.

== History and team members ==
WordNet was first created in 1985, in English only, in the Cognitive Science Laboratory of Princeton University under the direction of psychology professor George Armitage Miller. It was later directed by Christiane Fellbaum. The project was initially funded by the U.S. Office of Naval Research, and later also by other U.S. government agencies, including the DARPA, the National Science Foundation, the Disruptive Technology Office (formerly the Advanced Research and Development Activity) and REFLEX. George Miller and Christiane Fellbaum received the 2006 Antonio Zampolli Prize for their work with WordNet.

The Global WordNet Association is a non-commercial organization that provides a platform for discussing, sharing and connecting WordNets for all languages in the world. Christiane Fellbaum and Piek Th. J. M. Vossen are its co-presidents.

== Database contents ==
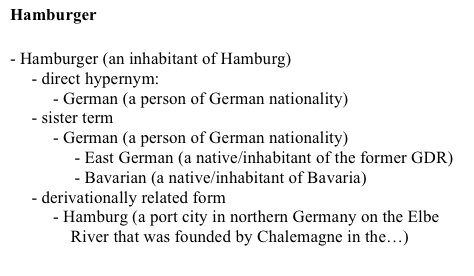
Example entry "Hamburger" in WordNet

The database contains 155,327 words organized in 175,979 synsets for a total of 207,016 word-sense pairs; in compressed form, it is about 12 megabytes in size.

It includes the lexical categories nouns, verbs, adjectives and adverbs but ignores prepositions, determiners and other function words.

Words from the same lexical category that are roughly synonymous are grouped into synsets, which include simplex words as well as collocations like "eat out" and "car pool". The different senses of a polysemous word form are assigned to different synsets. A synset's meaning is further clarified with a short defining gloss and one or more usage examples. An example adjective synset:

good, right, ripe – (most suitable or right for a particular purpose; "a good time to plant tomatoes"; "the right time to act"; "the time is ripe for great sociological changes")

All synsets are connected by means of semantic relations. These relations, which are not all shared by all lexical categories, include:

- Nouns
  - hypernym: Y is a hypernym of X if every X is a (kind of) Y (canine is a hypernym of dog)
  - hyponym: Y is a hyponym of X if every Y is a (kind of) X (dog is a hyponym of canine)
  - coordinate term: Y is a coordinate term of X if X and Y share a hypernym (wolf is a coordinate term of dog, and dog is a coordinate term of wolf)
  - holonym: Y is a holonym of X if X is a part of Y (building is a holonym of window)
  - meronym: Y is a meronym of X if Y is a part of X (window is a meronym of building)
- Verbs
  - hypernym: the verb Y is a hypernym of the verb X if the activity X is a (kind of) Y (to perceive is an hypernym of to listen)
  - troponym: the verb Y is a troponym of the verb X if the activity Y is doing X in some manner (to lisp is a troponym of to talk)
  - entailment: the verb Y is entailed by the verb X if by doing X you must be doing Y (to sleep is entailed by to snore)
  - coordinate term: the verb Y is a coordinate term of the verb X if X and Y share a hypernym (to lisp is a coordinate term of to yell, and to yell is a coordinate term of to lisp)

These semantic relations hold among all members of the linked synsets. Individual synset members (words) can also be connected with lexical relations. For example, (one sense of) the noun "director" is linked to (one sense of) the verb "direct" from which it is derived via a "morphosemantic" link.

The morphology functions of the software distributed with the database try to deduce the lemma or stem form of a word from the user's input. Irregular forms are stored in a list, and looking up "ate" will return "eat", for example.

== Knowledge structure ==
Both nouns and verbs are organized into hierarchies, defined by hypernym or IS A relationships. For instance, one sense of the word dog is found following hypernym hierarchy; the words at the same level represent synset members. Each set of synonyms has a unique index.

- dog, domestic dog, Canis familiaris
  - canine, canid
    - carnivore
      - placental, placental mammal, eutherian, eutherian mammal
        - mammal
          - vertebrate, craniate
            - chordate
              - animal, animate being, beast, brute, creature, fauna
                - ...

At the top level, these hierarchies are organized into 25 beginner "trees" for nouns and 15 for verbs (called lexicographic files at a maintenance level). All are linked to a unique beginner synset, "entity". Noun hierarchies are far deeper than verb hierarchies.

Adjectives are not organized into hierarchical trees. Instead, two "central" antonyms such as "hot" and "cold" form binary poles, while "satellite" synonyms such as "steaming" and "chilly" connect to their respective poles via a "similarity" relations. The adjectives can be visualized in this way as "dumbbells" rather than as "trees".

== Psycholinguistic aspects ==
The initial goal of the WordNet project was to build a lexical database that would be consistent with theories of human semantic memory developed in the late 1960s. Psychological experiments indicated that speakers organized their knowledge of concepts in an economic, hierarchical fashion. Retrieval time required to access conceptual knowledge seemed to be directly related to the number of hierarchies the speaker needed to "traverse" to access the knowledge. Thus, speakers could more quickly verify that canaries can sing because a canary is a songbird, but required slightly more time to verify that canaries can fly (where they had to access the concept "bird" on the superordinate level) and even more time to verify canaries have skin (requiring look-up across multiple levels of hyponymy, up to "animal"). While such psycholinguistic experiments and the underlying theories have been subject to criticism, some of WordNet's organization is consistent with experimental evidence. For example, anomic aphasia selectively affects speakers' ability to produce words from a specific semantic category, a WordNet hierarchy. Antonymous adjectives (WordNet's central adjectives in the dumbbell structure) are found to co-occur far more frequently than chance, a fact that has been found to hold for many languages.

== As a lexical ontology ==
WordNet is sometimes called an ontology, a persistent claim that its creators do not make. The hypernym/hyponym relationships among the noun synsets can be interpreted as specialization relations among conceptual categories. In other words, WordNet can be interpreted and used as a lexical ontology in the computer science sense. However, such an ontology should be corrected before being used, because it contains hundreds of basic semantic inconsistencies; for example there are, (i) common specializations for exclusive categories and (ii) redundancies in the specialization hierarchy. Furthermore, transforming WordNet into a lexical ontology usable for knowledge representation should normally also involve (i) distinguishing the specialization relations into subtypeOf and instanceOf relations, and (ii) associating intuitive unique identifiers to each category. Although such corrections and transformations have been performed and documented as part of the integration of WordNet 1.7 into the cooperatively updatable knowledge base of WebKB-2, most projects claiming to reuse WordNet for knowledge-based applications (typically, knowledge-oriented information retrieval) simply reuse it directly.

WordNet has also been converted to a formal specification, by means of a hybrid bottom-up top-down methodology to automatically extract association relations from it and interpret these associations in terms of a set of conceptual relations, formally defined in the DOLCE foundational ontology.

In most works that claim to have integrated WordNet into ontologies, the content of WordNet has not simply been corrected when it seemed necessary; instead, it has been heavily reinterpreted and updated whenever suitable. This was the case when, for example, the top-level ontology of WordNet was restructured according to the OntoClean-based approach, or when it was used as a primary source for constructing the lower classes of the SENSUS ontology.

== Limitations ==
The most widely discussed limitation of WordNet (and related resources like ImageNet) is that some of the semantic relations are more suited to concrete concepts than to abstract concepts. For example, it is easy to create hyponyms/hypernym relationships to capture that a "conifer" is a type of "tree", a "tree" is a type of "plant", and a "plant" is a type of "organism", but it is difficult to classify emotions like "fear" or "happiness" into equally deep and well-defined hyponyms/hypernym relationships.

Many of the concepts in WordNet are specific to certain languages and the most accurate reported mapping between languages is 94%. Synonyms, hyponyms, meronyms, and antonyms occur in all languages with a WordNet so far, but other semantic relationships are language-specific. This limits the interoperability across languages. However, it also makes WordNet a resource for highlighting and studying the differences between languages, so it is not necessarily a limitation for all use cases.

WordNet does not include information about the etymology or the pronunciation of words and it contains only limited information about usage. WordNet aims to cover most everyday words and does not include much domain-specific terminology.

WordNet is the most commonly used computational lexicon of English for word-sense disambiguation (WSD), a task aimed at assigning the context-appropriate meanings (i.e. synset members) to words in a text. However, it has been argued that WordNet encodes sense distinctions that are too fine-grained. This issue prevents WSD systems from achieving a level of performance comparable to that of humans, who do not always agree when confronted with the task of selecting a sense from a dictionary that matches a word in a context. The granularity issue has been tackled by proposing clustering methods that automatically group together similar senses of the same word.

=== Offensive content ===
WordNet includes words that can be perceived as pejorative or offensive. The interpretation of a word can change over time and between social groups, so it is not always possible for WordNet to define a word as "pejorative" or "offensive" in isolation. Therefore, people using WordNet must apply their own methods to identify offensive or pejorative words.

However, this limitation is true of other lexical resources like dictionaries and thesauruses, which also contain pejorative and offensive words. Some dictionaries indicate words that are pejoratives, but do not include all the contexts in which words might be acceptable or offensive to different social groups. Therefore, people using dictionaries must apply their own methods to identify all offensive words.

=== Licensed vs. Open WordNets ===
Some wordnets were subsequently created for other languages. A 2012 survey lists the wordnets and their availability. In an effort to propagate the usage of wordnets, the Global WordNet community had been slowly re-licensing their wordnets to an open domain where researchers and developers can easily access and use wordnets as language resources to provide ontological and lexical knowledge in natural-language processing (NLP) tasks.

The Open Multilingual Wordnet provides access to open licensed wordnets in a variety of languages. Version 1 is linked to the Princeton Wordnet of English, while version 2 uses an independent index (the Collaborative Interlingual Index). The goal is to make it easy to use wordnets in multiple languages.

== Applications ==
WordNet has been used for a number of purposes in information systems, including word-sense disambiguation, information retrieval, automatic text classification, automatic text summarization, machine translation and even automatic crossword puzzle generation.

A common use of WordNet is to determine the similarity between words. Various algorithms have been proposed, including measuring the distance among words and synsets in WordNet's graph structure, such as by counting the number of edges among synsets. The intuition is that the closer two words or synsets are, the closer their meaning. A number of WordNet-based word similarity algorithms are implemented in a Perl package called WordNet::Similarity, and in a Python package called NLTK. Other more sophisticated WordNet-based similarity techniques include ADW, whose implementation is available in Java. WordNet can also be used to inter-link other vocabularies.

== Interfaces ==
Princeton maintains a list of related projects that includes links to some of the widely used application programming interfaces available for accessing WordNet using various programming languages and environments.

== Related projects and extensions ==
WordNet is connected to several databases of the Semantic Web. WordNet is also commonly reused via mappings between the WordNet synsets and the categories from ontologies. Most often, only the top-level categories of WordNet are mapped.

=== Global WordNet Association ===
The Global WordNet Association (GWA) is a public and non-commercial organization that provides a platform for discussing, sharing and connecting wordnets for all languages in the world. The GWA also promotes the standardization of wordnets across languages, to ensure its uniformity in enumerating the synsets in human languages. The GWA keeps a list of wordnets developed around the world.

=== Other languages ===
- Arabic WordNet: WordNet for Arabic language.
- Arabic Ontology, a linguistic ontology that has the same structure as wordnet, and mapped to it.
- The BalkaNet project has produced WordNets for six European languages (Bulgarian, Czech, Greek, Romanian, Turkish and Serbian). For this project, a freely available XML-based WordNet editor was developed. This editor – VisDic – is not in active development anymore, but is still used for the creation of various WordNets. Its successor, DEBVisDic, is client-server application and is currently used for the editing of several WordNets (Dutch in Cornetto project, Polish, Hungarian, several African languages, Chinese).
- BulNet is a Bulgarian version of the WordNet developed at the Department of Computational Linguistics of the Institute for Bulgarian Language, Bulgarian Academy of Sciences.
- CWN (Chinese Wordnet or 中文詞彙網路) supported by National Taiwan University.
- The EuroWordNet project has produced WordNets for several European languages and linked them together; these are not freely available however. The Global Wordnet project attempts to coordinate the production and linking of "wordnets" for all languages. Oxford University Press, the publisher of the Oxford English Dictionary, has voiced plans to produce their own online competitor to WordNet.
- FinnWordNet is a Finnish version of the WordNet where all entries of the original English WordNet were translated.
- GermaNet is a German version of the WordNet developed by the University of Tübingen.
- The IndoWordNet is a linked lexical knowledge base of wordnets of 18 scheduled languages of India viz., Assamese, Bangla, Bodo, Gujarati, Hindi, Kannada, Kashmiri, Konkani, Malayalam, Meitei (Manipuri), Marathi, Nepali, Odia, Punjabi, Sanskrit, Tamil, Telugu and Urdu.
- JAWS (Just Another WordNet Subset), another French version of WordNet built using the Wiktionary and semantic spaces.
- WordNet Bahasa: WordNet for Malay and Indonesia language, developed by Nanyang University of Technology.
- Malayalam WordNet, developed by Cochin University Of Science and Technology.
- Multilingual Central Repository (MCR) integrates in the same EuroWordNet framework wordnets from Spanish, Catalan, Basque, Galician and Portuguese liked to English.
- The MultiWordNet project, a multilingual WordNet aimed at producing an Italian WordNet strongly aligned with the Princeton WordNet.
- OpenDutchWordNet, is a Dutch lexical semantic database.
- OpenWN-PT is a Brazilian Portuguese version of the original WordNet freely available for download under CC-BY-SA license.
- plWordNet is a Polish-language version of WordNet developed by Wrocław University of Technology.
- PolNet is a Polish-language version of WordNet developed by Adam Mickiewicz University in Poznań (distributed under CC BY-NC-ND 3.0 license).

Projects such as BalkaNet and EuroWordNet made it feasible to create standalone wordnets linked to the original one. Two such projects were the Russian WordNet, patronized by Petersburg State University of Means of Communication and led by S. A. Yablonsky, and Russnet, by Saint Petersburg State University.

- UWN is an automatically constructed multilingual lexical knowledge base extending WordNet to cover over a million words in many different languages.
- WOLF (WordNet Libre du Français), a French version of WordNet.

=== Linked data ===
- BabelNet, a very large multilingual semantic network with millions of concepts obtained by integrating WordNet and Wikipedia using an automatic mapping algorithm.
- The SUMO ontology has a complete manual mapping between all of the WordNet synsets and all of SUMO (including its domain ontologies, when WordNet contains a word sense for a given SUMO term) which is browsable at, for example .
- OpenCyc, an open ontology and knowledge base of everyday common sense knowledge, has 12,000 terms linked to WordNet synonym sets.
- DOLCE, is the first module of the WonderWeb Foundational Ontologies Library (WFOL). This upper-ontology has been developed in light of rigorous ontological principles inspired by the philosophical tradition, with a clear orientation toward language and cognition. OntoWordNet is the result of an experimental alignment of WordNet's upper level with DOLCE. It is suggested that such alignment could lead to an "ontologically sweetened" WordNet, meant to be conceptually more rigorous, cognitively transparent, and efficiently exploitable in several applications.
- DBpedia, a database of structured information, is linked to WordNet.
- The eXtended WordNet is a project at the University of Texas at Dallas which aims to improve WordNet by semantically parsing the glosses, thus making the information contained in these definitions available for automatic knowledge processing systems. It is freely available under a license similar to WordNet's.
- The GNU Collaborative International Dictionary of English project produced a dictionary by combining a public domain Webster's Dictionary from 1913 with some WordNet definitions and material provided by volunteers. It was released under the copyleft license GPL.
- ImageNet is an image database organized according to the WordNet hierarchy (currently only the nouns), in which each node of the hierarchy is depicted by millions of images. Currently, it has over 500 images per node on average.
- BioWordnet, a biomedical extension of wordnet was abandoned due to issues about stability over versions.
- WikiTax2WordNet, a mapping between WordNet synsets and Wikipedia categories.
- WordNet++, a resource including over millions of semantic edges harvested from Wikipedia and connecting pairs of WordNet synsets.
- SentiWordNet, a resource for supporting opinion mining applications obtained by tagging all the WordNet 3.0 synsets according to their estimated degrees of positivity, negativity, and neutrality.
- ColorDict, is an Android application to mobiles phones that use Wordnet database and others, like Wikipedia.
- UBY-LMF a database of 10 resources including WordNet.

=== Related projects ===
- TaxoLLaMa is a WordNet-based model designed to enhance LLMs' ability to capture lexical-semantic knowledge.
- FrameNet is a lexical database that shares some similarities with, and refers to, WordNet.
- Lexical markup framework (LMF) is an ISO standard specified within ISO/TC37 in order to define a common standardized framework for the construction of lexicons, including WordNet. The subset of LMF for Wordnet is called Wordnet-LMF. An instantiation has been made within the KYOTO project.
- UNL Programme is a project under the auspices of UNO aimed to consolidate lexicosemantic data of many languages to be used in machine translation and information extraction systems.
- Meaning Monkey is a free online dictionary based on the WordNet database.
- Dictionary.video is a video dictionary focusing on pronunciations. Its text part is extended from WordNet.

== Distributions ==
WordNet Database is distributed as a dictionary package (usually a single file) for the following software:

- Babylon
- GoldenDict
- Lingoes
- LexSemantic : Digital Platform for publishing reference works (dictionaries, encyclopedias, etc.). Includes WordnetPlus.

== See also ==
- Lexical Markup Framework
- Machine-readable dictionary
- Synonym ring
- Taxonomy
