= Arabic Ontology =

Linguistic ontology

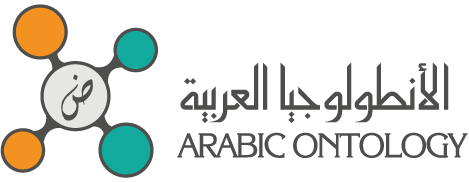
- Website type: Ontology
- Owner: Birzeit University
- Creator: Mustafa Jarrar
- Website: ontology.birzeit.edu
- Commercial: No
- Launched: 2018-09-25
- Content license: copyright

Arabic Ontology is a website offering linguistic ontology services for the Arabic language which can be used like the online site WordNet. Users can use Arabic Ontology to classify or clarify the concepts and meanings of Arabic terms.

== Ontology Structure ==
The ontology structure (i.e., data model) is similar to WordNet's structure. Each concept in the database is given a unique concept identifier (URI), informally described by a gloss, and lexicalized by one or more synonymous lemma terms.

Each term-concept pair is called a sense, and is given a SenseID. A set of senses is called synset. Concepts and senses are described by further attributes such as era and area — to specify example usage and ontological analysis. Semantic relations are defined between concepts. Some important entities are included in the ontology, such as individual countries and bodies of water. These individuals are given separate IndividualIDs and linked with their concepts through the InstanceOf relation.

== Mappings to other resources ==
Concepts in the Arabic Ontology are mapped to synsets in WordNet, as well as to BFO and DOLCE. Terms used in the Arabic Ontology are mapped to lemmas in the LDC's SAMA database.

== Applications ==
Arabic Ontology can be used in many application domains, such as:

1. Information retrieval, to enrich queries (e.g., in search engines) and improve the quality of the results, i.e. meaningful search rather than string-matching search;
2. Machine translation and word-sense disambiguation, by finding the exact mapping of concepts across languages, especially that the Arabic ontology is also mapped to the WordNet;
3. Data Integration and interoperability in which the Arabic ontology can be used as a semantic reference to link databases and information systems;
4. Semantic Web and Web 3.0, by using the Arabic ontology as a semantic reference to disambiguate the meanings used in websites; among many other applications.

== URLs Design ==
The URLs in the Arabic Ontology are designed according to the W3C's Best Practices for Publishing Linked Data, as described in the following URL schemes. This allows one to also explore the whole database like exploring a graph:

1. Ontology Concept: Each concept in the Arabic Ontology has a ConceptID and can be accessed using: https://{domain}/concept/{ConceptID | Term}. In case of a term, the set of concepts that this term lexicalizes are all retrieved. In case of a ConceptID, the concept and its direct subtypes are retrieved, e.g. https://ontology.birzeit.edu/concept/293198
2. Semantic relations: Relationships between concepts can be accessed using these schemes: (i) the URL: https:// {domain}/concept/{RelationName}/{ConceptID} allows retrieval of relationships among ontology concepts. (ii) the URL: https://{domain}/lexicalconcept/{RelationName}/{lexicalConceptID} allows retrieval of relations between lexical concepts. For example, https://ontology.birzeit.edu/concept/instances/293121 retrieves the instances of the concept 293121. The relations that are currently used in our database are: {subtypes, type, instances, parts, related, similar, equivalent}.
