= Lexis (linguistics) =

All the words in a language collectively

In linguistics, the term lexis (from Ancient Greek: λέξις 'word') designates the complete set of all possible words in a language, or a particular subset of words that are grouped by some specific linguistic criteria. For example, the general term English lexis refers to all words of the English language, while more specific term English religious lexis refers to a particular subset within English lexis, encompassing only words that are semantically related to the religious sphere of life.

In systemic-functional linguistics, a lexis or lexical item is the way one calls a particular thing or a type of phenomenon. Since a lexis from a systemic-functional perspective is a way of calling, it can be realised by multiple grammatical words such as "The White House", "New York City" or "heart attack". Moreover, since a lexis is a way of calling, different words such as child, children, child's and children's may realise the same lexical item.

== Lexical groups ==
Lexical grouping may be:

- Formulaic: it relies on partially fixed expressions and highly probable word combinations
- Idiomatic: it follows conventions and patterns for usage
- Metaphoric: concepts such as time and money, business and sex, systems and water, all share a large portion of the same vocabulary
- Grammatical: it uses rules based on sampling of the lexical corpus
- Register-specific: it uses the same word differently and/or less frequently in different contexts

A major area of study, psycholinguistics and neurolinguistics, involves the question of how words are retrieved from the mental lexical corpus in online language processing and production. For example, the cohort model seeks to describe lexical retrieval in terms of segment-by-segment activation of competing lexical entries.

== Formulaic language ==
In recent years, the compilation of language databases using real samples from speech and writing has enabled researchers to take a fresh look at the composition of languages. Among other things, statistical research methods offer reliable insight into the ways in which words interact. Discoveries have been made regarding the dichotomy between language use (how language is used) and language usage (how language could be used).

Language use shows which occurrences of words and their partners are most probable. The major finding of this research is that language users rely to a very high extent on ready-made language "lexical chunks", which can be easily combined to form sentences. This eliminates the need for the speaker to analyse each sentence grammatically, yet deals with a situation effectively. Typical examples include "I see what you mean" or "Could you please hand me the..." or "Recent research shows that..."

Language usage, on the other hand, is what takes place when the ready-made chunks do not fulfill the speaker's immediate needs; in other words, a new sentence is about to be formed and must be analyzed for correctness. Grammar rules have been internalised by native speakers, allowing them to determine the viability of new sentences. Language usage might be defined as a fall-back position when all other options have been exhausted.

== Context and co-text ==
When analyzing the structure of language statistically, a useful place to start is with high frequency context words, or so-called Key Word in Context (KWICs). After millions of samples of spoken and written language have been stored in a database, these KWICs can be sorted and analyzed for their co-text, or words which commonly co-occur with them. Principles with which KWICs can be analyzed include:

- Collocation: words and their co-occurrences (examples include "fulfill needs" and "fall-back position").
- Semantic prosody: the connotation words carry ("pay attention" can be neutral or remonstrative, as when a teacher says to a pupil: "Pay attention!"
- Colligation: the grammar that words use (while "I hope that suits you" sounds natural, "I hope that you are suited by that" does not).
- Register: the text style in which a word is used ("President vows to support allies" is most likely found in news headlines, whereas "vows" in speech most likely refer to "marriages"; in writing, the verb "vow" is most likely used as "promise").

Once data has been collected, it can be sorted to determine the probability of co-occurrences. One common and well-known way is with a concordance: the KWIC is centered and shown with dozens of examples of it in use, as with the example for "possibility" below.

=== Concordance for possibility ===
   About to be put on looks a real possibility. Now that Benn is no longer
   Hiett, says that remains a real possibility: As part of the PLO, the PLF
            Graham added. That's a possibility as well," Whitlock admitted.
          Severe pain was always a possibility. Early in the century, both
  that, when possible, every other possibility, including speeches by outside
    that we can, that we use every possibility, including every possibility of
  could be let separately. Another possibility is `constructive vandalism'
  a people reject violence and the possibility of violence can the possibility
 the French vote and now enjoy the possibility of winning two seats in the
       immediately investigate the possibility of criminal charges and that her
   Sri Lankan sources say that the possibility of negotiating with the Tamil
 Sheikhdoms too there might be the possibility of encouraging agitation.
   the twelve member states on the possibility of their threatening to
 Marie had already looked into the possibility of persuading the [f]
 a function of dependency, but the possibility of capitalist development,
      were almost defenceless. The possibility of an invasion had been apparent
   oddly and are worried about the possibility of drug use, say so. Tell them
 was first convened to discuss the possibility of a coup d'état to return the
        in the mi5 line and in the possibility of the state being used to smear
   reasons behind the move was the possibility of a new market. Cheap terminals
    be assessed individually.  The possibility of genetic testing brings that
   given the privilege.  The other possibility, of course, is that the jaunt
           All this undermines the possibility of economic reform and requires
    get. (Knowing that there is no possibility of attempting coitus takes the
  who was openly cynical about the possibility of achieving socialism 5
     so that they can perceive the possibility of being citizens engaged in
    poisoning and fire, facing the possibility of their own death just to be
        hearing yesterday that the possibility of using the agency to gather
  in 1903, and I don't foresee any possibility replacing that.  The car we
  a genetic factor at work here, a possibility supported by at least a few
     refused even to entertain the possibility that any of the nations of the
  has a long history, there is the possibility that the recent upsurge in
      Police are investigating the possibility that she was seen a short time
  any doctors who think there is a possibility that they may have been infected
   are in a store, there is a good possibility that you are wearing moisturizer
          living must be made. The possibility that a young adult will be
 he'd completed his account of the possibility that there was a drug-smuggling
 has been devoted to exploring the possibility that so-called ancient peoples

Once such a concordance has been created, the co-occurrences of other words with the KWIC can be analyzed. This is done by means of a t-score. If we take for example the word "stranger" (comparative adjective and noun), a t-score analysis will provide us with information such as word frequency in the corpus: words such as "no" and "to" are not surprisingly very frequent; a word such as "controversy" much less. It then calculates the occurrences of that word together with the KWIC ("joint frequency") to determine if that combination is unusually common, in other words, if the word combination occurs significantly more often than would be expected by its frequency alone. If so, the collocation is considered strong.

In this example, "no stranger to" is a very frequent collocation; so are words such as "mysterious", "handsome", and "dark". Some other examples include "no stranger to controversy" and "perfect stranger". Such a word combination could not be predicted on its own, as it does not mean "a stranger who is perfect" as we should expect. Its unusually high frequency shows that the two words collocate strongly and as an expression are highly idiomatic.

The study of corpus linguistics provides us with many insights into the real nature of language, as shown above. In essence, the lexical corpus seems to be built on the premise that language use is best approached as an assembly process, whereby the brain links together ready-made chunks. Intuitively, this makes sense: it is a natural shortcut to alleviate the burden of having to "re-invent the wheel" every time we speak. Additionally, using well-known expressions conveys loads of information rapidly, as the listener does not need to break down an utterance into its constituent parts. In Words and Rules, Steven Pinker shows this process at work with regular and irregular verbs: we collect the former, which provide us with rules we can apply to unknown words (for example, the "‑ed" ending for past tense verbs allows us to decline the neologism "to google" into "googled"). Other patterns, the irregular verbs, we store separately as unique items to be memorized.

== Metaphor as an organizational principle for lexis ==
Another method of effective language storage in the lexical corpus includes the use of metaphor as a storage principle. ("Storage" and "files" are good examples of how human memory and computer memory have been linked to the same vocabulary; this was not always the case.) George Lakoff's work is usually cited as the cornerstone to studies of metaphor in the language. One example is quite common: "time is money". We can save, spend and waste both time and money. Another example comes from business and sex: businesses penetrate the market, attract customers, and discuss "relationship management". Business is also war: launch an ad campaign, gain a foothold (already a climbing metaphor in military usage) in the market, suffer losses. Systems, on the other hand, are water: a flood of information, overflowing with people, flow of traffic. The NOA theory of lexical acquisition argues that the metaphoric sorting filter helps to simplify language storage and avoid overload.

== Grammar ==
Computer research has revealed that grammar, in the sense of its ability to create entirely new language, is avoided as far as possible. Biber and his team working at the University of Arizona on the Cobuild GSWE noted an unusually high frequency of word bundles that, on their own, lack meaning. But a sample of one or two quickly suggests their function: they can be inserted as grammatical glue without any prior analysis of form. Even a cursory observation of examples reveals how commonplace they are in all forms of language use, yet we are hardly aware of their existence. Research suggests that language is heavily peppered with such bundles in all registers; two examples include "do you want me to", commonly found in speech, or "there was no significant" found in academic registers. Put together in speech, they can create comprehensible sentences, such as "I'm not sure" + "if they're" + "they're going" to form "I'm not sure if they're going". Such a sentence eases the burden on lexical items as it requires no grammatical analysis whatsoever.

== Register ==
British linguist Michael K. Halliday proposes a useful dichotomy of spoken and written language which actually entails a shift in paradigm: while linguistic theory posits the superiority of spoken language over written language (as the former is the origin, comes naturally, and thus precedes the written language), or the written over the spoken (for the same reasons: the written language being the highest form of rudimentary speech), Halliday states they are two entirely different entities.

He claims that speech is grammatically complex while writing is lexically dense. In other words, a sentence such as "a cousin of mine, the one about whom I was talking the other day—the one who lives in Houston, not the one in Dallas—called me up yesterday to tell me the very same story about Mary, who..." is most likely to be found in conversation, not as a newspaper headline. "Prime Minister vows conciliation", on the other hand, would be a typical news headline. One is more communicative (spoken), the other is more a recording tool (written).

Halliday's work suggests something radically different: language behaves in registers. Biber et al. working on the LGSWE worked with four (these are not exhaustive, merely exemplary): conversation, literature, news, academic. These four registers clearly highlight distinctions within language use which would not be clear through a "grammatical" approach. Not surprisingly, each register favors the use of different words and structures: whereas news headline stories, for example, are grammatically simple, conversational anecdotes are full of lexical repetition. The lexis of the news, however, can be quite dense, just as the grammar of speech can be incredibly complicated.

== See also ==
- Lexicography
- Lexical semantics

== Sources ==
- Altenberg, Bengt; Granger, Sylviane, eds. (2002). Lexis in Contrast: Corpus-based Approaches. Amsterdam: John Benjamins Publishing. ISBN 1588110907.
- Chase, Thomas (1988). The English Religious Lexis. Lewiston: EMP. ISBN 9780889468269.
- Hakulinen, Auli; Selting, Margret, eds. (2005). Syntax and Lexis in Conversation: Studies on the Use of Linguistic Resources in Talk-in-interaction. Amsterdam: John Benjamins Publishing. ISBN 9789027226273.
- Ruano-García, Javier (2010). Early Modern Northern English Lexis: A Literary Corpus-based Study. Bern: Peter Lang. ISBN 9783034300582.
