= Tista Bagchi =

Indian Professor of Linguistics

- Born: 1 October 1964; Calcutta, India
- Education: University of Chicago; Sanskrit College, Kolkata; University of Delhi; University of Calcutta
- Scientific career
- Fields: Linguistics Cognitive Sciences
- Workplaces: University of Delhi

Tista Bagchi (born 1 October 1964) is an Indian linguist and ethicist who is a professor of linguistics at the University of Delhi. Her research focuses on semantics, syntax, South Asian languages, cognitive science and ethics.

== Early life and education ==
Bagchi is the eldest daughter of economist Amiya Kumar Bagchi and feminist critic and activist Jasodhara Bagchi. She studied at Sanskrit College, Kolkata, and the University of Delhi, before obtaining her PhD in linguistics from the University of Chicago.

== Academic career and research ==
Bagchi's research has covered semantics and syntax, particularly in South Asian languages as well as questions of ethics concerning medical technology and social interaction. Her work also includes translations of Bengali literary texts and studies in comparative philology.

She has also worked in cognitive science, examining relationships between sentence structure, computation, linguistic meaning and human cognition.

During the 2001–2002 academic year, Bagchi was a Robert F. and Margaret S. Goheen Fellow at the National Humanities Center in North Carolina. From 2010 to 2012, she worked as a scientist under the Council of Scientific and Industrial Research (CSIR) Mobility Scheme at the National Institute of Science, Technology, and Development Studies in New Delhi.

== Books ==
- Languages of India: Annotated translation of Gopal Haldar, Bharater Bhasha [in Bengali]. New Delhi: National Book Trust. ISBN 81-237-2936-7 (2000)
- English Syntax: Introductory textbook-cum-manual for the M. A. English course (Language Stream) of the Indira Gandhi National Open University. New Delhi: School of Humanities, IGNOU. ISBN 81-7605642-1 (2000)
- Proceedings of the International Seminar on Construction of Knowledge held at Vidya Bhawan Society, Udaipur, 16–18 April 2004, jointly edited with R. K. Agnihotri, Vidya Bhavan Society, Udaipur (2005)
- Jnaan ka Nirmaan (in Hindi: Construction of Knowledge: translation of co-edited 2005 volume with R. K. Agnihotri, tr. Sushila Joshi), Vidya Bhavan Society, Udaipur. (2007)
- The Sentence in Language and Cognition, Lanham, MD: Lexington Books, Rowman & Littlefield Publishing Group. ISBN 978-0739118450 (2007)
- Pragmatics and Autolexical Grammar: In Honor of Jerry Sadock, jointly edited with Etsuyo Yuasa, and Katharine P. Beals. Amsterdam and Philadelphia: John Benjamins. ISBN 9789027255594 (2011)

== Journal articles and articles published in edited volumes ==
- Control, reflexives, and automodularity in Bangla imperfective participial complements. In Katharine P. Beals et al., eds. (1993) CLS 29, vol. 1: The Main Session, 17–32. Chicago: Chicago Linguistic Society.
- Bangla correlative pronouns, relative clause order, and D-linking. In Miriam Butt, Tracy Holloway King, and Gillian Ramchand, eds. (1994) Theoretical Perspectives on Word Order in South Asian Languages, 1329 Stanford: Center for the Study of Language and Information (CSLI).
- Bengali writing. In Peter T. Daniels and William Bright, eds. (1996) The World's Writing Systems, pp. 399–403. New York: Oxford University Press.
- Generic sentences, social kinds, and stereotypes. In Rajeev Bhargava et al., eds. (1999) Multiculturalism, Liberalism, and Democracy, pp. 308–322. New Delhi: Oxford University Press.
- Romany language. In The Students’ Britannica-India (2000), vol. iv, pp. 307–308. New Delhi: Encyclopædia Britannica Inc.
- Turing's 'Computing Machinery and Intelligence' revisited: cognition from a linguistic perspective. In J. R. Isaac and Karuna Batra, eds. (2000) Cognitive Systems: Reviews and Previews, pp. 728–733. New Delhi: NIIT-Phoenix.
- Linguistic methods and minority languages in India. In Sujata Patel et al., eds. (2002) Thinking Social Science in India: Essays in Honour of Alice Thorner. New Delhi: Sage.
- Causation and tense in subordinate clauses: conjunctive participles and conditionals in Bangla and Hindi. In Salikoko S. Mufwene, Elaine J. Francis, and Rebecca S. Wheeler, eds. (2005) Polymorphous Linguistics: Jim McCawley’s Legacy, pp. 109–134. Cambridge, Mass.: MIT Press.
- Morally right action under silence and disempowerment. In XXIst World Philosophy Conference Proceedings, vol. 9: Philosophical Anthropology, ed. (2006) Stephen Voss, pp. 161 –166. Istanbul: International Federation of Philosophical Societies (FISP) and Turkish Philosophical Society.
- On theta role assignment by feature checking. In Linguistik Aktuell 108: Argument Structure, eds. (2007) Eric Reuland, Tanmoy Bhattacharya, and Giorgos Spathas, pp. 159–173. Amsterdam/Philadelphia: John Benjamins.
- “Biological”. Translation of Narendranath Mitra, “jaiba”, in Jasodhara Bagchi, Subhoranjan Dasgupta, and Subhasree Ganguly, eds. (2009) The Trauma and the Triumph: Gender and Partition in Eastern India, vol. II. Kolkata: Stree Publications.
- The signing system of Mudra in traditional Indian dance. Paragrana: Internationale Zeitschrift für Historische Anthropologie,(2010) Band 19.1: pp. 259–266.
- Review of John Peterson (2011) A Grammar of Kharia (Leiden:Brill). Himalayan Linguistics 11.1 (online), https://web.archive.org/web/20140512220431/http://www.linguistics.ucsb.edu/HimalayanLinguistics/reviews/2012/HL1101_RA.pdf
- Regulation of human reproduction-related technologies in India. In India Science and Technology, vol. 2, eds. (2013) NISTADS Editorial Team, pp. 243–245. New Delhi: Foundation Books (Cambridge University Press, India) and CSIR-NISTADS.
- Sign language and signing in the traditions of performance in India. Forthcoming in People’s Linguistic Survey of India (Chief Editor: Ganesh N. Devy): Indian Sign Language(s), eds. (2014) Tanmoy Bhattacharya, Nisha Grover, and Surinder P. K. Randhawa, 118–127. New Delhi: Orient Blackswan.

== Membership in learned bodies and committees ==
- Member, Chicago Linguistic Society, 1988–1993.
- Member, Student-Faculty Liaison Committee, Department of Linguistics, University of Chicago, 1992–1993.
- Member, Faculty of Arts, University of Delhi, 1994–1997 and 2000–2001.
- Member, Linguistic Society of America, since 2000.
- International Associate Member, American Philosophical Association, since 2002.
- Overseas Associate Member, Forum for European Philosophy, 2002–2006.
- Member, Society for Applied Philosophy, United Kingdom, 2005–2007.
- Nominated Member, Indian Council for Social Science Research, 2005–2008.
- Member-Representative for the ICSSR, Indian Council for Philosophical Research, 2006–2008.
- Member, Academic Council, The English & Foreign Languages University, 2008–2009.
- Member, Academic Council, Central Sikkim University, 2008–2011.
- Member, Technical Advisory Committee of the Social Sciences Division, Indian Statistical Institute, 2012–2014.
- Member, Advisory Committee, Centre for Neural and Cognitive Sciences, University of Hyderabad, 2013–2014.
