= Derived type =

In computer science, derived type can mean:

- a composite data type, one built out of other types
- a subtype
- a derived class
