= Lingoes =

Dictionary and machine translation software

- Lingoes showing the Appendices configuration window
- Developer: Kevin Yau
- Stable release: 2.9.2 / August 16, 2014
- Operating system: Windows
- Type: Machine translation
- License: Freeware
- Website: lingoes.net

Lingoes is a dictionary and machine translation app. Lingoes was created in China. Lingoes is often compared to its competitor Babylon because of similarities in their GUI, functionalities and most importantly being freeware.

== Features and expandability ==
Lingoes in action, showing a popup translation window with Essential dictionary and Longman's Dictionary installed

Dictionaries and encyclopedias can be installed on Lingoes in the form of new add-ons to extend its functionality. Add-ons for Wikipedia, Baidu Baike, Longman Dictionary of Contemporary English, Merriam-Webster's Collegiate Dictionary, WordNet, MacMillan English Dictionary, Collins English Dictionary and other cross-English dictionaries (e.g. Arabic, French or German) are available in Lingoes' official website.

The program has the ability to pronounce words and install additional text-to-speech engines available for download also through Lingoes' website.

Lingoes also offers a whole-text translation ability using online translation service providers like Google Translate, Yahoo! Babel Fish Translation, SYSTRAN, Cross-Language, Click2Translate, and others. Lingoes offers to translate a text via a mouse-over popup, or by double-clicking the selected text.

Additional tools, termed as appendices in the program, include a currency converter, weights and measure units converter and international time zones converter. Additional ones, such as the periodic table of elements, a scientific calculator, Traditional Chinese and Simplified Chinese conversion utility or a Base64 encoding utility, can be added through the website.

== See also ==
- Comparison of machine translation applications
