= BulPosCor =

The Bulgarian Part of Speech-annotated Corpus (BulPosCor) (in Bulgarian: Български Пос анотиран корпус (БулПосКор)) is a morphologically annotated general monolingual corpus of written language where each item in a text is assigned a grammatical tag. BulPosCor is created by the Department of Computational Linguistics at the Institute for Bulgarian Language of the Bulgarian Academy of Sciences and consists of 174 697 lexical items. BulPosCor has been compiled from the Structured "Brown" Corpus of Bulgarian by sampling 300+ word-excerpts (expanded to sentence boundary) from the original BCB files in such a way as to preserve the BCB overall structure. The annotation process consists of a primary stage of automatically assigning tags from the Bulgarian Grammar Dictionary and a stage of manual resolving of morphological ambiguities. The disambiguated corpus consists of 174,697 lexical units.

== Access ==
BulPOSCor Search Interface

== See also ==
- Corpus linguistics
- Natural Language Processing
- Bulgarian National Corpus
