= Arabic WordNet =

Arabic WordNet is a WordNet for Arabic language, since its creation in 2006, it has been extended in 2015.
