= Has-a =

Composition relationship in object-oriented programming

In database design, object-oriented programming and design, has-a (has_a or has a) is a composition relationship where one object (often called the constituted object, or part/constituent/member object) "belongs to" (is part or member of) another object (called the composite type), and behaves according to the rules of ownership. In simple words, has-a relationship in an object is called a member field of an object. Multiple has-a relationships will combine to form a possessive hierarchy.

== Related concepts ==
"Has-a" is to be contrasted with an is-a (is_a or is a) relationship which constitutes a taxonomic hierarchy (subtyping).

The decision whether the most logical relationship for an object and its subordinate is not always clearly has-a or is-a. Confusion over such decisions have necessitated the creation of these metalinguistic terms. A good example of the has-a relationship is containers in the C++ STL.

To summarize the relations, we have

- hypernym-hyponym (supertype-subtype) relations between types (classes) defining a taxonomic hierarchy, where
  - for an inheritance relation: a hyponym (subtype, subclass) has a type-of (is-a) relationship with its hypernym (supertype, superclass);
- holonym-meronym (whole/entity/container-part/constituent/member) relations between types (classes) defining a possessive hierarchy, where
  - for an aggregation (i.e. without ownership) relation:
    - a holonym (whole) has a has-a relationship with its meronym (part),
  - for a composition (i.e. with ownership) relation:
    - a meronym (constituent) has a part-of relationship with its holonym (entity),
  - for a containment relation:
    - a meronym (member) has a member-of relationship with its holonym (container);
- concept-object (type-token) relations between types (classes) and objects (instances), where
  - a token (object) has an instance-of relationship with its type (class).

== Examples ==
=== Entity–relationship model ===
Entity–relationship model

In databases has-a relationships are usually represented in an Entity–relationship model. As you can see by the diagram on the right an account can have multiple characters. This shows that account has a "has-a" relationship with character.

=== UML class diagram ===
UML class diagram Composition and aggregation

In object-oriented programming this relationship can be represented with a Unified Modeling Language Class diagram. This has-a relationship is also known as composition. As you can see from the Class Diagram on the right a car "has-a" carburetor, or a car is "composed of" a carburetor. When the diamond is coloured black it signifies composition, i.e. the object on the side closest to the diamond is made up of or contains the other object. While the white diamond signifies aggregation, which means that the object closest to the diamond can have or possess the other object.

=== C++ ===
Car, chassis and tires objects

Another way to distinguish between composition and aggregation in modeling the real world, is to consider the relative lifetime of the contained object. For example, if a Car object contains a Chassis object, a Chassis will most likely not be replaced during the lifetime of the Car. It will have the same lifetime as the car itself; so the relationship is one of composition. On the other hand, if the Car object contains a set of Tire objects, these Tire objects may wear out and get replaced several times. Or if the Car becomes unusable, some Tires may be salvaged and assigned to another Car. At any rate, the Tire objects have different lifetimes than the Car object; therefore the relationship is one of aggregation.

If one were to make a C++ software Class to implement the relationships described above, the Car object would contain a complete Chassis object in a data member. This Chassis object would be instantiated in the constructor of the Car class (or defined as the data type of the data member and its properties assigned in the constructor.) And since it would be a wholly contained data member of the Car class, the Chassis object would no longer exist if a Car class object was to be deleted.

On the other hand, the Car class data members that point to Tire objects would most likely be C++ pointers. Tire objects could be instantiated and deleted externally, or even assigned to data members of a different Car object. Tire objects would have an independent lifetime separate from when the Car object was deleted.

== See also ==
- Object composition
- Has-a
  - Holonymy
  - Meronymy
- Is-a
  - Hypernymy (and supertype)
  - Hyponymy (and subtype)
