= Composite data type =

Programming language construct

In computer science, a composite data type or compound data type is a data type that consists of programming language scalar data types and other composite types that may be heterogeneous and hierarchical in nature. It is sometimes called a structure or a record or by a language-specific keyword used to define one such as struct. It falls into the aggregate type classification which includes homogenous collections such as the array and list.

== See also ==
- Object composition – Method in computer programming of forming higher-level object types
- Record (computer science) – Composite data type
- Scalar (mathematics) – Elements of a field, e.g. real numbers, in the context of linear algebra
- Struct (C programming language) – C keyword for defining a structured data type
