= IndoWordNet =

Linked lexical knowledge base of wordnets of 18 languages of India

IndoWordNet is a linked lexical knowledge base of wordnets of 18 scheduled languages of India, viz., Assamese, Bangla, Bodo, Gujarati, Hindi, Kannada, Kashmiri, Konkani, Malayalam, Meitei (Manipuri), Marathi, Nepali, Odia, Punjabi, Sanskrit, Tamil, Telugu and Urdu. Wordnets are computational databases of words used for Natural Language Processing, Information Extraction, Word Sense Disambiguation and other forms of computational processing involving text.

Dravidian WordNet is a WordNet for Dravidian Languages.

== Background ==
In early 1990s, the original wordnet for English—called Princeton WordNet—was created at Princeton University in a project led by George Miller and Christiane Fellbaum, who later received the prestigious Zampoli Prize in 2006. Then followed the EuroWordNet—the conglomeration of European language wordnets—which was established in 1998.

== Importance of Indian languages ==
Indian languages form a significant component of the linguistic landscape of the world. There are 4 language families in the Indian subcontinent—Indo European, Dravidian, Tibeto Burman and Austro Asiatic. Several Indian languages are among the top-ranked languages in the world in terms of the population speaking them, most notably Hindi-Urdu (5th), Bangla (7th), Marathi (12th), and so on, as per the List of languages by number of native speakers. Creating wordnets for Indian languages is therefore a worthwhile techno-scientific and linguistic endeavour.

== Genesis of Indian language wordnets ==
Initial work started in 2000 with the Hindi WordNet being created by the Natural Language Processing group at the Center for Indian Language Technology (CFILT) in the Computer Science and Engineering Department at IIT Bombay. It was made publicly available in 2006 under the GNU license. The Hindi WordNet was created with support from the TDIL project of the Ministry of Communication and Information Technology, India and also partial support from the Ministry of Human Resources Development, India.

In subsequent years, wordnets for other languages of India followed. The large nationwide project of building Indian language wordnets was called the IndoWordNet project. IndoWordNet is a linked lexical knowledge base of wordnets of 18 scheduled languages of India, viz., Assamese, Bangla, Bodo, Gujarati, Hindi, Kannada, Kashmiri, Konkani, Malayalam, Meitei, Marathi, Nepali, Oriya, Punjabi, Sanskrit, Tamil, Telugu and Urdu. The wordnets are getting created by using expansion approach from the Hindi WordNet. The Hindi WordNet was created from first principles (mentioned below) and was the first wordnet for an Indian language. The method adopted was the same as with the Princeton WordNet for English.

IndoWordNet is thus highly similar to EuroWordNet. However, the pivot language is Hindi, which, of course, is linked to the English WordNet.

The Indian language wordnet building efforts forming the subcomponents of IndoWordNet project are: North East WordNet project, Dravidian WordNet Project and Indradhanush project all of which are funded by the TDIL project.

== Principles of wordnet construction ==
The wordnets follow the principles of minimality, coverage and replaceability for the synsets. This means that there should be at least a 'core' set of lexemes in the synset that uniquely give the concept represented by the synset (minimality), e.g., {house, family} standing for the concept of 'family' ("she is from a noble house"). Then the synset should cover all the words representing the concept in the language (coverage), e.g., the word 'ménage' will have to appear in the 'family' synset, albeit, towards the end of the synset, since its usage is rare. Finally, the words towards the beginning of the synset should be able to replace one another in reasonable amount of corpus contexts (replaceability), e.g., 'house' and 'family' can replace each other in the sentence "she is from a noble house".

The IndoWordNet project differs from some other related projects in that typical Indian language phenomena such as complex predicates and causative verbs are captured.

== Data ==
IndoWordNet is publicly browsable. The number of synsets (as of August 2014) in the languages and the institutes creating the language WordNets are as follows:

Language	Synsets	Institute
Assamese	14958	Guwahati University, Guwahati, Assam
Bengali	36346	Indian Statistical Institute, Kolkata, West Bengal
Bodo	15785	Guwahati University, Guwahati, Assam
Gujarati	35599	Dharamsinh Desai University, Nadiad, Gujarat
Hindi	38607	IIT Bombay, Mumbai, Maharashtra
Kannada	20033	Mysore University, Mysore, Karnataka
Kashmiri	29469	Kashmir University, Srinagar, Jammu and Kashmir
Konkani	32370	Goa University, Taleigao, Goa
Malayalam	30060	Amrita University, Coimbatore, Tamil Nadu
Marathi	29674	IIT Bombay, Mumbai, Maharashtra
Meitei	16351	Manipur University, Imphal, Manipur
Nepali	11713	Assam University, Silchar, Assam
Oriya	35284	Hyderabad Central University, Hyderabad, Andhra Pradesh
Punjabi	32364	Thapar University and Punjabi University, Patiala, Punjab
Sanskrit	23140	IIT Bombay, Mumbai, Maharashtra
Tamil	25431	Tamil University, Thanjavur, Tamil Nadu
Telugu	21925	Dravidian University, Kuppam, Andhra Pradesh
Urdu	34280	Jawaharlal Nehru University, New Delhi
