= Gillian Ramchand =

Linguist

- Occupation: Linguist

Academic background
- Education: Stanford University

Academic work
- Institutions: Magdalen College, University of Oxford
- Main interests: Syntax, Semantics, Argument structure

Gillian Ramchand (born 1965) is a linguist who specializes in syntax, semantics, and the syntax-semantics interface. As of 2024, she is Professor of Syntax and Semantics at Magdalen College, University of Oxford.

== Biography ==
Ramchand grew up in Jamaica and Trinidad and received her PhD in linguistics from Stanford University in 1994, with a dissertation entitled, "Aspect and Argument Structure in Modern Scottish Gaelic." She subsequently spent 10 years working at the University of Oxford as a lecturer in general linguistics before moving to Tromsø in 2004, where she became full professor two years later in 2006. From 2025, she is returning to Oxford as Professor of Syntax and Semantics.

Her widely cited research focuses on the syntax-semantics interface, especially argument structure. She has worked on a variety of languages, including Scottish Gaelic, Bengali, and English.

== Honors and distinctions ==
Ramchand was Chairperson of Generative Linguistics in the Old World (GLOW) from 2017-2022.

In 2018 Ramchand was elected to the Academy of Europe.

== Selected publications ==
- Ramchand, Gillian. 1997. Aspect and predication: The semantics of argument structure. Oxford: Oxford University Press. ISBN 9780198236511
- Adger, David, and Ramchand, Gillian. 2005. Merge and Move: Wh-dependencies revisited. Linguistic Inquiry 36(2), 161–193.
- Ramchand, Gillian, and Reiss, Charles. 2007. The Oxford handbook of linguistic interfaces. Oxford: Oxford University Press. ISBN 9780199247455
- Ramchand, Gillian. 2008. Verb meaning and the lexicon: A first phase syntax. Cambridge: Cambridge University Press. ISBN 9780521842402
- Ramchand, Gillian, and Svenonius, Peter. 2014. Deriving the functional hierarchy. Language Sciences 46, 152–174.
- Ramchand, Gillian. 2018. Situations and syntactic structures: Rethinking auxiliaries and order in English. Cambridge, MA: MIT Press. ISBN 9780262535038
