= Is-a =

Subsumption relationship between abstractions

In knowledge representation, ontology components and ontology engineering, including for object-oriented programming and design, is-a (also written as is_a or is a) is a subsumptive (Note: See Liskov substitution principle.) relationship between abstractions (e.g., types, classes), wherein one class A is a subclass of another class B (and so B is a superclass of A). In other words, type A is a subtype of type B when A's specification implies B's specification. That is, any object (or class) that satisfies A's specification also satisfies B's specification, because B's specification is weaker.

For example, a cat 'is a[n]' animal, but not vice versa. All cats are animals, but not all animals are cats. Behaviour that is relevant to all animals is defined on an animal class, whereas behaviour that is relevant only for cats is defined in a cat class. By defining the cat class as 'extending' the animal class, all cats 'inherit' the behaviour defined for animals, without the need to explicitly code that behaviour for cats.

== Related concepts ==
The is-a relationship is to be contrasted with the has-a (has_a or has a) relationship between types (classes); confusing the relations has-a and is-a is a common error when designing a model (e.g., a computer program) of the real-world relationship between an object and its subordinate. The is-a relationship may also be contrasted with the instance-of relationship between objects (instances) and types (classes): see Type–token distinction.

To summarize the relations, there are:

- hyperonym–hyponym (supertype/superclass–subtype/subclass) relations between types (classes) defining a taxonomic hierarchy, where
  - for a subsumption relation: a hyponym (subtype, subclass) has a type-of (is-a) relationship with its hyperonym (supertype, superclass);
- holonym–meronym (whole/entity/container–part/constituent/member) relations between types (classes) defining a possessive hierarchy, where
  - for an aggregation (i.e. without ownership) relation:
    - a holonym (whole) has a has-a relationship with its meronym (part),
  - for a composition (i.e. with ownership) relation:
    - a meronym (constituent) has a part-of relationship with its holonym (entity),
  - for a containment relation:
    - a meronym (member) has a member-of relationship with its holonym (container);
- concept–object (type–token) relations between types (classes) and objects (instances), where
  - a token (object) has an instance-of relationship with its type (class).

== See also ==
- Inheritance (object-oriented programming)
- Liskov substitution principle (in object-oriented programming)
- Subsumption
- Is-a
  - Hypernymy (and supertype)
  - Hyponymy (and subtype)
- Has-a
  - Holonymy
  - Meronymy
