= Institute for Bulgarian Language =

The Institute for Bulgarian Language (in Bulgarian: Институт за български език, romanized: Institut za bulgarski ezik) is the language regulator of the Bulgarian language. It was created on 15 May 1942, and is based in Sofia, Bulgaria. The institute develops a Bulgarian national dictionary, publishes magazines on linguistic research, and offers courses, including a PhD programme. It is part of the Bulgarian Academy of Sciences.

== History ==
The Institute for Bulgarian Language was first established by the Bulgarian Academy of Sciences as the Bulgarian Dictionary Service under its umbrella in the Kingdom of Bulgaria. During the Second World War, funding was difficult for many Bulgarian educational institutions but funding was guaranteed for the Bulgarian Dictionary Service as a result of the Prime Minister of Bulgaria allocating funds for their work.

In 1947, it became the Bulgarian Dictionary Service. Then in 1949 under the communist People's Republic of Bulgaria, it became the independent Institute for Bulgarian Language. In 1951, additional linguists were employed by the Institute due to the establishment of several new departments as a result of the Institute becoming the official language regulator for the Bulgarian language. As a part of their work, they recognise educators of the Bulgarian language outside of Bulgaria as well as protecting the official language from the inclusion of loan-words from non-Bulgarian languages like English, Greek and Russian. They have researchers from over 80 countries working there.
