= Hypernymy and hyponymy =

Semantic relations involving the type-of property

An example of the relationship between hyponyms and hypernym

Hypernymy and hyponymy are the semantic relations between a generic term (hypernym) and a more specific term (hyponym). The hypernym is also called a supertype, umbrella term, or blanket term. The hyponym names a subtype of the hypernym. The semantic field of the hyponym is included within that of the hypernym. For example, "pigeon", "crow", and "hen" are all hyponyms of "bird" and "animal"; "bird" and "animal" are both hypernyms of "pigeon", "crow", and "hen".

== Discussion ==
In linguistics, semantics, general semantics, and ontologies, hyponymy (from Ancient Greek ὑπό (hupó) 'under' and ὄνυμα (ónuma) 'name') shows the relationship between a generic term (hypernym) and a specific instance of it (hyponym). A hyponym is a word or phrase whose semantic field is more specific than its hypernym. The semantic field of a hypernym, also known as a superordinate, is broader than that of a hyponym. An approach to the relationship between hyponyms and hypernyms is to view a hypernym as consisting of hyponyms. This, however, becomes more difficult with abstract words such as imagine, understand and knowledge. While hyponyms are typically used to refer to nouns, it can also be used on other parts of speech. Like nouns, hypernyms in verbs are words that refer to a broad category of actions. For example, verbs such as stare, gaze, view and peer can also be considered hyponyms of the verb look, which is their hypernym.

The meaning relation between hyponyms and hypernyms applies to lexical items of the same word class (that is, part of speech), and holds between senses rather than words. For instance, the word screwdriver as most immediately understood refers to the screwdriver tool, and not to the screwdriver drink.

Hypernymy and hyponymy are converse relations. If X is a kind of Y, then X is a hyponym of Y and Y is a hypernym of X. Hyponymy is a transitive relation: if X is a hyponym of Y, and Y is a hyponym of Z, then X is a hyponym of Z. For example, violet is a hyponym of purple and purple is a hyponym of color; therefore violet is a hyponym of color. A word can be both a hypernym and a hyponym: for example purple is a hyponym of color but itself is a hypernym of the broad spectrum of shades of purple between the range of crimson and violet.

The hierarchical structure of semantic fields can be seen in hyponymy. These can be conceptualized as a vertical arrangement, where the higher level is more general and the lower level is more specific. For example, living things will be the highest level followed by plants and animals, and the lowest level may comprise dog, cat and wolf.

=== Taxonymy ===
Taxonymy (not to be confused with, though related to, taxonomy) is a sub-variety of hyponymy. Within the structure of a taxonomic lexical hierarchy, two types of hyponymic relation may be distinguished: the first—exemplified in "An X is a Y"—corresponds to so-called "simple" hyponymy; the second—that which is exemplified in "An X is a kind/type of Y"—is more discriminating, and functions as the "vertical" relation in the taxonomy. This latter relation is that which may be termed taxonymy.

A taxonomic lexical hierarchy is structured by, in addition to the above inclusion relations, its corresponding relations of exclusion: "A Z is not a Y", or incompatibility; and "A Z is a different kind/type of Y than X", or co-taxonymy.

=== Co-hyponyms ===
If the hypernym Z consists of hyponyms X and Y, then X and Y are identified as co-hyponyms, also known as coordinate terms. Co-hyponyms are labelled as such when separate hyponyms share the same hypernym but are not hyponyms of one another, unless they happen to be synonymous. For example, screwdriver, scissors, knife, and hammer are all co-hyponyms of one another and hyponyms of tool, but not hyponyms of one another: *"A hammer is a type of knife" is false.

Co-hyponyms are often but not always related to one another by the relation of incompatibility. For example, apple, peach and plum are co-hyponyms of fruit. However, an apple is not a peach, which is also not a plum. Thus, they are incompatible. Nevertheless, co-hyponyms are not necessarily incompatible in all senses. A queen and mother are both hyponyms of woman but there is nothing preventing the queen from being a mother. This shows that compatibility may be relevant.

=== Autohyponyms ===
Three varieties of autohyponym

A word is an autohyponym if it is used for both a hypernym and its hyponym: it has a stricter sense that is entirely a subset of a broader sense. For example, the word dog describes both the species Canis familiaris and male individuals of Canis familiaris, so it is possible to say "That dog isn't a dog, it's a bitch" ("That hypernym Z isn't a hyponym Z, it's a hyponym Y"). The term "autohyponym" was coined by linguist Laurence R. Horn, in his 1984 paper "Ambiguity, negation, and the London School of Parsimony". Linguist Ruth Kempson had already observed that if there are hyponyms for one part of a set but not another, the hypernym can complement the existing hyponym by being used for the remaining part. For example, fingers describe all digits on a hand, but the existence of the word thumb for the first finger means that fingers can also be used for "non-thumb digits on a hand". Autohyponymy is also called "vertical polysemy". (Note: In part because the term autohyponymy is ambiguous because it is itself an autohyponym.)

Horn called this "licensed polysemy", but found that autohyponyms also formed even when there is no other hyponym. Yankee is autohyponymous because it is a hyponym (native of New England) and its hypernym (native of the United States), even though there is no other hyponym of Yankee (as native of the United States) that means "not a native of New England". (Note: Horn identifies up to four layers of hyponym for Yankee: native of the United States, native of the northern United States, native of New England, or WASP native of New England.) Similarly, the verb to drink (a beverage) is a hypernym for to drink (an alcoholic beverage).

In some cases, autohyponyms duplicate existing, distinct hyponyms. The hypernym "smell" (to emit any smell) has a hyponym "stink" (to emit a bad smell), but is autohyponymous because "smell" can also mean "to emit a bad smell", even though there is no "to emit a smell that isn't bad" hyponym.

== Etymology ==
Hyperonym and hypernym mean the same thing, with both in use by linguists. The form hypernym interprets the -o- of hyponym as a part of hypo, such as in hypertension and hypotension. However, etymologically the -o- is part of the Greek stem ónoma. In other combinations with this stem, e.g. synonym, it is never elided. Therefore, hyperonym is etymologically more faithful than hypernym. Hyperonymy is used, for instance, by John Lyons, who does not mention hypernymy and prefers superordination. The nominalization hyperonymy is rarely used, because the neutral term to refer to the relationship is hypernymy.

== Usage ==
Computer science often terms this relationship an "is-a" relationship. For example, the phrase "Red is-a color" can be used to describe the hyponymic relationship between red and color.

Hyponymy is the most frequently encoded relation among synsets used in lexical databases such as WordNet. These semantic relations can also be used to compare semantic similarity by judging the distance between two synsets and to analyse anaphora.

As a hypernym can be understood as a more general word than its hyponym, the relation is used in semantic compression by generalization to reduce a level of specialization.

The notion of hyponymy is particularly relevant to language translation, as hyponyms are very common across languages. For example, in Japanese the word for older brother is ani (兄), and the word for younger brother is otōto (弟). An English-to-Japanese translator presented with a phrase containing the English word brother would have to choose which Japanese word equivalent to use. This would be difficult, because abstract information (such as the speakers' relative ages) is often not available during machine translation.

== See also ==
- Contrast set – Collection of related items in a schema or ontology
- Has-a – Composition relationship in object-oriented programming
- Is-a – Subsumption relationship between abstractions
- Genus proximum – Type of intensional definition
- Lexical semantics – Subfield of linguistic semantics
- Meronymy and holonymy – Semantic relation of a part to the whole
- -onym – Suffix used in linguistics
- Polysemy – Capacity for a sign to have multiple related meanings
- Subcategory – Category whose objects and morphisms are inside a bigger category
- Synonym – Words or phrases of the same meaning
- Taxonomy – Development of classes and classifications
- Type–token distinction – Distinguishing objects and classes of objects

== Sources ==
- Snow, Rion; Jurafsky, Daniel; Ng, Andrew Y. (2004). "Learning syntactic patterns for automatic hypernym discovery" (PDF). Advances in Neural Information Processing Systems. 17.
- Hearst, M. (1992). "Automatic acquisition of hyponyms from large text corpora". Proceedings of 14th International Conference on Computational Linguistics. 2: 539. doi:10.3115/992133.992154.
