= Meronymy and holonymy =

Semantic relation of a part to the whole

In linguistics, meronymy (from Ancient Greek μέρος (méros) 'part' and ὄνυμα (ónuma) 'name') is a semantic relation between a meronym denoting a part and a holonym denoting a whole. In simpler terms, a meronym is in a part-of relationship with its holonym. For example, finger is a meronym of hand, which is its holonym. Similarly, engine is a meronym of car, which is its holonym. Fellow meronyms (naming the various fellow parts of any particular whole) are called comeronyms (for example, leaves, branches, trunk, and roots are comeronyms under the holonym of tree).

Holonymy (from Ancient Greek ὅλος (hólos) 'whole' and ὄνυμα (ónuma) 'name') is the converse of meronymy.

A closely related concept is that of mereology, which specifically deals with part–whole relations and is used in logic. It is formally expressed in terms of first-order logic. A meronymy can also be considered a partial order.

Meronym and holonym refer to part and whole respectively, which is not to be confused with hypernym which refers to type. For example, a holonym of leaf might be tree (a leaf is a part of a tree), whereas a hypernym of oak tree might be tree (an oak tree is a type of tree).

== See also ==
- Has-a
- Hyponymy and hypernymy
- Is-a
- Mereological essentialism
- Mereological nihilism
- Synecdoche
