= Ontology components =

Description of aspects of ontology

Contemporary ontologies share many structural similarities, regardless of the ontology language in which they are expressed. Most ontologies describe individuals (instances), classes (concepts), attributes, and relations.

== List ==
Common components of ontologies include:

Individuals
instances or objects (the basic or "ground level" objects; the tokens).
Classes
sets, collections, concepts, types of objects, or kinds of things.
Attributes
aspects, properties, features, characteristics, or parameters that individuals (and classes and relations) can have.
Relations
ways in which classes and individuals can be related to one another. Relations can carry attributes that specify the relation further.
Function terms
complex structures formed from certain relations that can be used in place of an individual term in a statement.
Restrictions
formally stated descriptions of what must be true in order for some assertion to be accepted as input.
Rules
statements in the form of an if-then (antecedent-consequent) sentence that describe the logical inferences that can be drawn from an assertion in a particular form.
Axioms
assertions (including rules) in a logical form that together comprise the overall theory that the ontology describes in its domain of application. This definition differs from that of "axioms" in generative grammar and formal logic. In these disciplines, axioms include only statements asserted as a priori knowledge. As used here, "axioms" also include the theory derived from axiomatic statements.
Events
the changing of attributes or relations.
Actions
types of events.

Ontologies are commonly encoded using ontology languages.

== Individuals ==
Individuals (instances) are the basic, "ground level" components of an ontology. The individuals in an ontology may include concrete objects such as people, animals, tables, automobiles, molecules, and planets, as well as abstract individuals such as numbers and words (although there are differences of opinion as to whether numbers and words are classes or individuals). Strictly speaking, an ontology need not include any individuals, but one of the general purposes of an ontology is to provide a means of classifying individuals, even if those individuals are not explicitly part of the ontology.

In formal extensional ontologies, only the utterances of words and numbers are considered individuals – the numbers and names themselves are classes. In a 4D ontology, an individual is identified by its spatio-temporal extent. Examples of formal extensional ontologies are BORO, ISO 15926 and the model in development by the IDEAS Group.

== Classes ==
In knowledge representation, a class is a collection of individuals or individuals objects. A class can be defined either by extension (specifying members), or by intension (specifying conditions). According to the type–token distinction, the ontology is divided into individuals, who are real worlds objects, or events, and types, or classes, who are sets of real world objects. Class expressions or definitions gives the properties that the individuals must fulfill to be members of the class. Individuals that fulfill the property are called instances (as in the computing concept).

== Attributes ==
Objects in an ontology can be described by relating them to other things, typically aspects or parts. These related things are often called attributes, although they may be independent things. Each attribute can be a class or an individual. The kind of object and the kind of attribute determine the kind of relation between them. A relation between an object and an attribute express a fact that is specific to the object to which it is related. For example, the Ford Explorer object has attributes such as:

- ⟨has as name⟩ Ford Explorer
- ⟨as by definition as part⟩ 6-speed transmission
- ⟨as by definition as part⟩ door (with as minimum and maximum cardinality: 4)
- ⟨as by definition as part one of⟩ {4.0L engine, 4.6L engine}

The value of an attribute can be a complex data type; in this example, the related engine can only be one of a list of subtypes of engines, not just a single thing.

Ontologies are only true ontologies if concepts are related to other concepts (the concepts do have attributes). If that is not the case, then you would have either a taxonomy (if hyponym relationships exist between concepts) or a controlled vocabulary. These are useful, but are not considered true ontologies.

== Relations ==
Relations (also known as relationships) between objects in an ontology specify how objects are related to other objects. Typically a relation is of a particular type (or class) that specifies in what sense the object is related to the other object in the ontology. For example, in the ontology that contains the concept Ford Explorer and the concept Ford Bronco might be related by a relation of type ⟨is defined as a successor of⟩. The full expression of that fact then becomes:

- Ford Explorer is defined as a successor of : Ford Bronco

This tells us that the Explorer is the model that replaced the Bronco. This example also illustrates that the relation has a direction of expression. The inverse expression expresses the same fact, but with a reverse phrase in natural language.

Much of the power of ontologies comes from the ability to describe relations. Together, the set of relations describes the semantics of the domain: that is, its various semantic relations, such as synonymy, hyponymy and hypernymy, coordinate relation, and others. The set of used relation types (classes of relations) and their subsumption hierarchy describe the expression power of the language in which the ontology is expressed.

Ford Explorer is-a-subclass-of 4-Wheel Drive Car, which in turn is-a-subclass-of Car.

An important type of relation is the subsumption relation (is-a-superclass-of, the converse of is-a, is-a-subtype-of or is-a-subclass-of). This defines which objects are classified by which class. For example, we have already seen that the class Ford Explorer is-a-subclass-of 4-Wheel Drive Car, which in turn is-a-subclass-of Car.

The addition of the is-a-subclass-of relationships creates a taxonomy; a tree-like structure (or, more generally, a partially ordered set) that clearly depicts how objects relate to one another. In such a structure, each object is the 'child' of a 'parent class' (Some languages restrict the is-a-subclass-of relationship to one parent for all nodes, but many do not).

Another common type of relations is the mereology relation, written as part-of, that represents how objects combine to form composite objects. For example, if we extended our example ontology to include concepts like Steering Wheel, we would say that a "Steering Wheel is-by-definition-a-part-of-a Ford Explorer" since a steering wheel is always one of the components of a Ford Explorer. If we introduce meronymy relationships to our ontology, the hierarchy that emerges is no longer able to be held in a simple tree-like structure since now members can appear under more than one parent or branch. Instead this new structure that emerges is known as a directed acyclic graph.

As well as the standard is-a-subclass-of and is-by-definition-a-part-of-a relations, ontologies often include additional types of relations that further refine the semantics they model. Ontologies might distinguish between different categories of relation types. For example:

- relation types for relations between classes
- relation types for relations between individuals
- relation types for relations between an individual and a class
- relation types for relations between a single object and a collection
- relation types for relations between collections

Relation types are sometimes domain-specific and are then used to store specific kinds of facts or to answer particular types of questions. If the definitions of the relation types are included in an ontology, then the ontology defines its own ontology definition language. An example of an ontology that defines its own relation types and distinguishes between various categories of relation types is the Gellish ontology.

For example, in the domain of automobiles, we might need a made-in type relationship which tells us where each car is built. So the Ford Explorer is made-in Louisville. The ontology may also know that Louisville is-located-in Kentucky and Kentucky is-classified-as-a state and is-a-part-of the U.S. Software using this ontology could now answer a question like "which cars are made in the U.S.?"
