= Semantic analysis =

Semantic analysis may refer to:

== Language ==
- Semantic analysis (linguistics)
  - Semantic analysis (computational)
- Semantic analysis (machine learning)
- Semantic Analysis (book), 1960, by Paul Ziff, on aesthetics/philosophy of language

== Other ontologies ==
- Semantic analytics of organisations
- Semantic analysis (knowledge representation) of Web content

== Other uses ==
- Semantic analysis of audio
- Semantic analysis (computer science)
  - Semantic analysis (compilers)
