= TMP =

TMP may refer to:

== Arts and entertainment ==
- Tickle Me Pink, a rock band from Colorado, US (2005–2011)
- Tiny Moving Parts, an emo band from Minnesota, US
- Tom Malone Prize, an Australian glass art prize
- Tsukuyomi -Moon Phase-, a 2000–2008 anime series
- Star Trek: The Motion Picture, a 1979 film
- Trivia Murder Party, a game series within The Jackbox Party Packs

== Businesses and organisations ==
- TMP Worldwide Advertising and Communications
- Te Māngai Pāho, a Māori broadcasting funder
- Trans Metro Pasundan, an Indonesian bus system
- Tipra Motha Party, an Indian political party
- Todd McFarlane Productions
- Toyota Motor Philippines

== Cartography ==
- Theban Mapping Project, of archaeologic sites
- Transverse Mercator projection

== Chemicals ==
- 2,2,6,6-Tetramethylpiperidine, an organic chemistry reagent
- Thymidine monophosphate, a nucleotide
- Trimethoprim, an antibiotic
- Trimethyl phosphate, a solvent
- Trimethylolpropane, a precursor to polymers

== Computing ==
- Tab Mix Plus, a Mozilla Firefox extension
- Template metaprogramming
- /tmp, a temporary directory on Unix or Linux systems
- Trusted Platform Module

== Language ==
- Time–manner–place, a grammatical feature

== Places ==
- East Timor, (ISO 3166-1:TMP)
- The Meeting Place (church), Winnipeg, Manitoba, Canada
- Royal Tyrrell Museum of Palaeontology, Drumheller, Alberta, Canada
- Tampere–Pirkkala Airport, Finland
- Thomas More Prep-Marian, a private high school in Hays, Kansas, US
- Trans Mountain pipeline, from Alberta to British Columbia, Canada

== Technologies ==
- Steyr TMP, a machine pistol made by Steyr Mannlicher
- Thermo mechanical pulp
- Transmembrane pressure, the pressure difference between feed and permeate stream in Ultrafiltration
- Turbomolecular pump, a high vacuum pump
