= Semantic analysis (computational) =

Computational application of concept approximation

Semantic analysis (computational) within applied linguistics and computer science, is a composite of semantic analysis and computational components. Semantic analysis refers to a formal analysis of meaning, and computational refers to approaches that in principle support effective implementation in digital computers.

== See also ==
- Computational semantics
- Natural language processing
- Semantic analytics
- Semantic analysis (machine learning)
- Semantic Web
- SemEval
