= Temporal annotation =

Study of semantic information regarding time

Temporal annotation is the study of how to automatically add semantic information regarding time to natural language documents. It plays a role in natural language processing and computational linguistics.

== About ==
Temporal annotation involves the application of a semantic annotation to a document. Significant temporal annotation standards include TimeML, ISO-TimeML and TIDES. These standards typically include annotations for some or all of temporal expressions (or timexes), events, temporal relations, temporal signals, and temporal relation types.

In natural language texts, events may be associated with times; e.g., they may start or end at a given at a time. Events are also associated with other events, like occurring before or after them. We call these relations temporal relations. Temporal relation typing classifies the relation between two arguments, and is an important and difficult sub-task of figuring out all the temporal information in a document. Allen's interval algebra is one scheme for types of temporal relations. Rule-engineering and machine learning approaches to temporal annotation have both been successful, though achieving high performance in temporal relation typing remains a difficult task.

== Applications ==
Successful temporal annotation enables systems to find out when facts asserted in texts are true, to build timelines, to extract plans, and to discover mentions of change. This has had applications in many domains, such as information extraction, digital history, processing social media, and clinical text mining.

== Evaluation ==
The TempEval task series sets a shared temporal annotation task, and has run at SemEval three times, attracting system entries from around the world. The task originally centred on determining the types of temporal relations only. In TempEval-2 and -3, this expanded to include event and timex annotation. In addition, the i2b2 clinical evaluation shared task was a temporal annotation exercise in 2012, which attracted a great deal of interest.

== See also ==
- Computational semantics
- Natural language processing
- SemEval
- TimeML
