= Mike Lesk =

American computer scientist (born 1945)

Michael E. Lesk
- Born: United States
- Education: Harvard University
- Known for: Lesk algorithm, Lex, SMART
- Awards: ACM Fellow (1996); NAE Member (2005)
- Scientific career
- Fields: IR, NLP, Programming languages
- Workplaces: Bellcore, Rutgers University

Michael E. Lesk (born 1945) is an American computer scientist.

== Biography ==
In the 1960s, Michael Lesk worked for the SMART Information Retrieval System project, wrote much of its retrieval code and did many of the retrieval experiments, as well as obtaining a BA degree in Physics and Chemistry from Harvard College in 1964 and a PhD from Harvard University in Chemical Physics in 1969.

From 1970 to 1984, Lesk worked at Bell Labs in the group that built Unix. Lesk wrote Unix tools for word processing (tbl, refer, and the standard ms macro package, all for troff), for compiling (Lex), and for networking (uucp). He also wrote the Portable I/O Library (the predecessor to stdio.h in C) and contributed significantly to the development of the C language preprocessor.

In 1984, he left to work for Bellcore, where he managed the computer science research group. There, Lesk worked on specific information systems applications, mostly with geography (a system for driving directions) and dictionaries (a system for disambiguating words in context). In the 1990s, Lesk worked on a large chemical information system, the CORE project, with Cornell, Online Computer Library Center, American Chemical Society, and Chemical Abstracts Service. From 1998 to 2002, Lesk headed the National Science Foundation's Division of Information and Intelligent Systems, where he oversaw Phase 2 of the NSF's Digital Library Initiative. He was a professor on the faculty of the Library and Information Science Department, School of Communication & Information, Rutgers University, from 2003 to 2023.

Lesk received the Flame award for lifetime achievement from Usenix in 1994, is a Fellow of the ACM in 1996, and in 2005 was elected to the National Academy of Engineering. He has authored a number of books.

== See also ==
- Lesk algorithm

== Bibliography ==
Selected books by Michael Lesk:

- Practical Digital Libraries: Books, Bytes, and Bucks, 1997. ISBN 978-1-55860-459-9.
- Understanding Digital Libraries, 2nd ed., December 2004. ISBN 978-1-55860-924-2.
