= Text simplification =

Automated process

Text simplification is an aspect of natural language processing that involves modifying, organizing, or categorizing existing text to make it easier to understand while retaining its original meaning. This process is essential in today's world, where communication is increasingly complex due to advancements in science, technology, and media. Human languages are inherently intricate, with extensive vocabularies and complex structures that can be challenging for machines to handle efficiently. Researchers have found that semantic compression techniques can help streamline and simplify text by reducing linguistic diversity and simplifying the vocabulary used in a given context.

== Example ==
Text simplification involves modifying complex sentences into simpler ones to enhance readability and comprehension. Siddharthan (2006) provides an example to illustrate this process. The original sentence contains multiple clauses and phrases, which can be broken down into simpler sentences for better understanding.

- Also contributing to the firmness in copper, the analyst noted, was a report by Chicago purchasing agents, which precedes the full purchasing agents report that is due out today and gives an indication of what the full report might hold.
- Also contributing to the firmness in copper, the analyst noted, was a report by Chicago purchasing agents. The Chicago report precedes the full purchasing agents report. The Chicago report gives an indication of what the full report might hold. The full report is due out today.

An approach to text simplification involves lexical simplification via lexical substitution, a process that replaces complex words with simpler synonyms. Identifying complex words is a challenge addressed by machine learning classifiers trained on labeled data. Researchers have found that asking labelers to sort words by complexity levels yields more consistent results than the traditional method of categorizing words as simple or complex.

== See also ==
- Automated paraphrasing
- Controlled natural language
- Language reform
- Lexical simplification
- Lexical substitution
- Semantic compression
- Text normalization
- Simplified English
- Basic English
