= Logic form =

Logic forms are simple, first-order logic knowledge representations of natural language sentences formed by the conjunction of concept predicates related through shared arguments. Each noun, verb, adjective, adverb, pronoun, preposition and conjunction generates a predicate. Logic forms can be decorated with word senses to disambiguate the semantics of the word. There are two types of predicates: events are marked with e, and entities are marked with x. The shared arguments connect the subjects and objects of verbs and prepositions together. Example input/output might look like this:

Input:  The Earth provides the food we eat every day.
Output: Earth:n_#1(x1) provide:v_#2(e1, x1, x2) food:n_#1(x2) we(x3) eat:v_#1(e2, x3, x2; x4) day:n_#1(x4)

Logic forms are used in some natural language processing techniques, such as question answering, as well as in inference both for database systems and QA systems.
