= Semantic structure analysis =

Linguistic methodology

Semantic structure analysis (or SSA) is a methodology for systematic description of the intended meaning of natural language, developed by the Summer Institute of Linguistics. The name is also used for Eugene Nida's technique for mapping lexical items from a source language to a receptor language in translation theory.

== See also ==
- Semantic analysis

== Bibliography ==
- Beekman, John, John C. Callow, and Michael F. Kopesec (1981). The Semantic Structure of Written Communication. Dallas: Summer Institute of Linguistics.
- Bouchard, Denis. The Semantics of Syntax: a minimalist approach to grammar.
- Bruce, Leslie P. (1998). "The semantics of reconciliation in three languages". Notes on Linguistics 83: 9–34.
- Casad, Eugene H., ed., (1996). Cognitive Linguistics in the Redwoods: the expansion of a new paradigm in linguistics. Cognitive Linguistics Research 6. Berlin: Mouton de Gruyter.
- Erikson, Richard J. (1999). "The damned and the justified in Romans 5:12–21". In Jeffrey T. Reed, Stanley E. Porter (eds). Discourse Analysis and the New Testament: approaches and results. Continuum International Publishing Group.
- Ohori, Toshio (1996). "Case Markers and Clause Linkage: toward a semantic typology". In Casad (1996): 693–712.
- Palmer, R. F. (ed.). Grammar and Meaning: essays in honor of Sir John Lyons.
- Tuggy, David (1996). "The thing is is that people talk that way. The question is is Why?" In Casad (1996): 713–752.
- Wierzbicka, Anna. Understanding cultures through their key words: English, Russian, Polish, German, and Japanese.
