= Semantic Brand Score =

Measure of brand importance

The Semantic Brand Score (SBS) is a measure of brand importance that is calculated on textual data. The measure is rooted in graph theory and partly connected to Keller's conceptualization of brand equity. It is calculated by converting texts into word or semantic networks and analyzing three key aspects: the frequency with which a brand name is mentioned (prevalence), the extent to which it is linked to distinctive and uncommon terms in the discourse (diversity), and its potential role as a bridge that connects otherwise unconnected or weakly connected terms or concepts (connectivity).

The metric has also been used more broadly as an indicator of semantic importance, with varying objectives, by examining different text sources, such as newspaper articles, online forums, scientific papers, or social media posts.

== Definition and calculation ==
=== Pre-processing ===
To compute the Semantic Brand Score, it is necessary to convert the analyzed texts into word networks, i.e., graphs where each node signifies a word. Connections between words are formed based on their co-occurrence within a specified distance threshold (a number of words). Natural language pre-processing is usually conducted to refine texts, which involves tasks such as removing stopwords and applying stemming. Here is a sample network derived from pre-processing the sentence "The dawn is the appearance of light - usually golden, pink or purple - before sunrise".

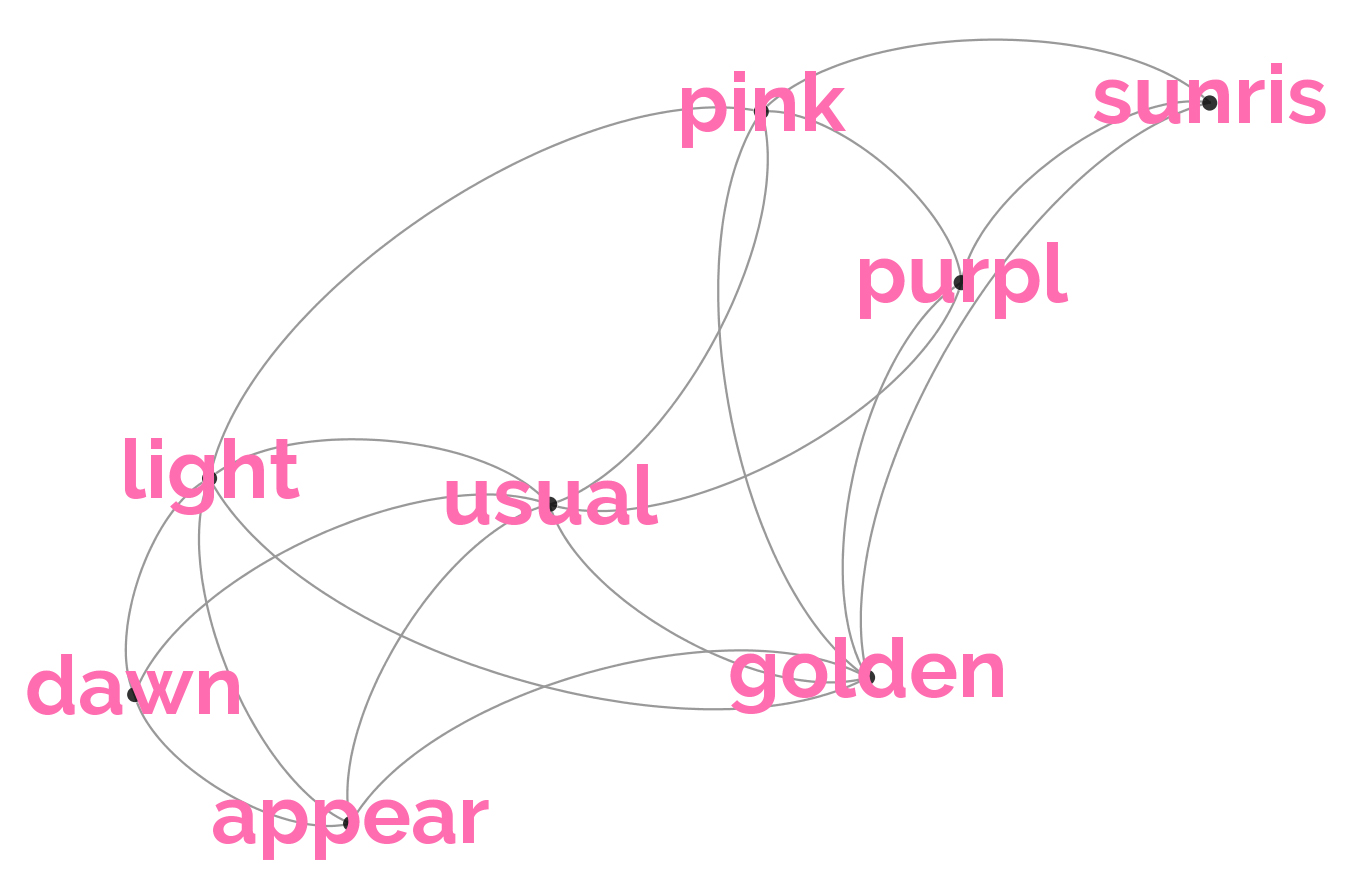

The SBS is a composite indicator with three dimensions: prevalence, diversity and connectitivy. SBS measures brand importance, a construct that cannot be understood by examining a single dimension alone.

=== Prevalence ===
Prevalence measures the frequency of brand name usage, indicating how often a brand is explicitly referenced in a corpus. The prevalence factor is associated with brand awareness, suggesting that a brand mentioned frequently in a text is more familiar to its authors. Likewise, frequent mentions of a brand name enhance its recognition and recall among readers.

=== Diversity ===
Diversity assesses the variety of words linked with a brand, focusing on textual associations. These textual associations refer to the words used alongside a particular brand or term. Measurement involves employing the degree centrality indicator, reflecting the number of connections a brand node has in the semantic network. Alternatively, an approach using distinctiveness centrality has been proposed, assigning greater significance to unique brand associations and reducing redundancy. The rationale is that distinctive textual associations enrich discussions about a brand, thereby enhancing its memorability.

Diversity can be calculated for the brand node in a word network, i.e., a weighted undirected graph G, made of n nodes and m arcs. If two nodes (terms or concepts), i and j, are not connected, then $w_{ij}=0$, otherwise the weight of the arc connecting them is $w_{ij} \ge 1$. In the following, $g_j$ is the degree of node j and $I_{(f)}$ is the indicator function which equals 1 if $f=TRUE$, i.e. if there is an arc connecting nodes i and j.

$DI (i) = \sum_{j=1,j\neq i}^{n}\log_{10}\frac{n-1}{g_{j}}I_{(w_{ij}>0)}$.

=== Connectivity ===
Connectivity evaluates a brand's connective power within broader discourse, indicating its capacity to serve as a bridge between various words/concepts (nodes) in the network. It captures a brand's brokerage power, its ability to connect different words, groups of words, or topics together. The calculation hinges on the weighted betweenness centrality metric.

The Semantic Brand Score indicator is given by the sum of the standardized values of prevalence, diversity, and connectivity. SBS standardization is typically performed by subtracting the mean from the raw scores of each dimension and then dividing by the standard deviation. This process takes into account the scores of all relevant words in the corpus.

== See also ==
- Big data
- Brand equity
- Brand management
- Brand valuation
- Graph theory
- Natural language processing
- Network theory
- Semantic analytics
- Social network analysis
- Text mining
