= Time–manner–place =

Grammatical feature of adverb order

In linguistic typology, time–manner–place is a sentence structure that defines the order of adpositional phrases and adverbs in a sentence: "yesterday", "by car", "to the store". Japanese, Afrikaans, Dutch, Mandarin, and German use this structure.

An example of this appositional ordering in German is:

Ich fahre heute mit dem Auto nach München.
I drive today with the car to Munich.
I'm travelling to Munich by car today.

The temporal phrase – heute (when? – "today") – comes first, the manner – mit dem Auto (how? – "by car") – is second, and the place – nach München (where? – "to Munich") – is third.

== See also ==
- Syntax
- Adverb
