= Semantic Analysis (book) =

1960 treatise by Paul Ziff on the philosophy of language

Semantic Analysis is a book written by American philosopher Paul Ziff. It was first published in 1960 but has been reprinted at least four times since.

== Synopsis ==
The book is, as the title suggests, about a semantic analysis of language, and particularly the word "Good" as it is used in English.

== Composition ==
The book is written in a large number of numbered paragraphs 246 to be exact. It also includes a short preface. The writing style is thus similar to Wittgenstein's Tractatus Logico-Philosophicus. The book has six chapters (Language, Semantic Analysis, Conditions, Truth Conditions, Meaning, The Word 'Good'), a bibliography and an index.
