= Paul Ziff =

American philosopher

(Robert) Paul Ziff (22 October 1920 in New York City – 9 January 2003 in Chapel Hill, North Carolina) was an American artist and philosopher specializing in semantics and aesthetics.

== Life and career ==
He was born in New York City in 1920 to William Ziff and Bessie Goldstein Ziff. His brother Morton was born three years earlier. He studied art at Columbia University and New York's Master Institute of Arts in 1937–1939, and was a practicing artist, partially subsidized by the Solomon R. Guggenheim Foundation until 1942. He returned to New York in 1945 after serving in the United States Coast Guard to study art and philosophy at Cornell University, receiving his BFA in January 1949, and his Ph.D in September 1951.

He spent two years at the University of Michigan, as a research assistant in the Language and Symbolism Project, and as an Instructor, before taking a post as instructor at Harvard University, becoming an Assistant Professor, in 1954. He remained at Harvard until 1959, taking two periods of leave, to study at Oxford University in 1955, and to teach at Princeton University in 1958.

From 1959 until 1964 he was assistant professor at the University of Pennsylvania. Between 1962 and 1963 he studied in Rome on a Guggenheim Fellowship.

From 1964 to 1968 he was a professor at the University of Wisconsin–Madison, and from 1968 to 1970 was a professor at the University of Illinois at Chicago before settling at the University of North Carolina as William Rand Kenan Jr. Professor from 1970 until 1988 (professor emeritus until 2003.)

The "Robert Paul Ziff Distinguished Professorship" was established at University of North Carolina in 1994. He died in 2003 of natural causes.

His marriages include Pauline Pitkorchemna Ziff of Endicott, NY 1948-1965; Rita Nolan 1965-1973; Judith Trafton of NYC 1973-1976; Loredana Simpson of Verona, Italy 1978-2003. His surviving children are Matthew D. Ziff, distinguished teacher of interior architecture, retired from Ohio University, father of Benjamin Ziff, councilman in Athens, Ohio; Georgina S.A. Ziff, an English professor at California State University and nearby community colleges, mother of Samuel Peter Ovenden and Matthew Ovenden; Andrew P. Ziff, a successful real estate developer in New York City father of Brianna, Isabelle, and Serena Ziff.

== Philosophical and other works ==
=== Articles ===
Paul Ziff started publishing in graduate school in 1949, doing book reviews for The Philosophical Review. He kept on publishing for 41 years, his last article appearing in 1990 in a special issue of the European journal Dialectica. No doubt he was asked to contribute a paper to that issue since it was dedicated - both the issue and his paper - to the memory of his former teacher at Cornell, Max Black.

Ziff published six books, 38 articles, five discussions, and 14 reviews. His first four books were published by Cornell University Press; his last two were published by Reidel. When he published with Cornell, it was one of the best university presses for philosophy. He moved to Reidel in the 1980s because their managing editor, Jaakko Hintikka, offered to accept two of his book-length manuscripts and publish them as consecutive volumes in the Synthese Library series.

Ziff's articles appeared most often in The Philosophical Review, Mind, The Journal of Philosophy, Analysis, and Foundations of Language (which became Studies in Language sometime in the late 70s). He was invited to contribute to various conference proceedings and collections, and fifteen of his articles and discussions appeared in these - some of them high-profile collections in their area at the time, including Katz and Fodor's The Structure of Language (1964) and Harman and Davidson’s Semantics of Natural Language (1972). Most of Ziff’s articles (29) show up in his books. One that did not, "About Proper Names" from Mind, was selected as one of the best philosophy articles of 1977 and reprinted in The Philosopher’s Annual. Ziff published mainly in the areas of philosophy of language, philosophy of art, philosophy of mind, and epistemology, but also had articles in philosophy of religion and ethics. He even had three about Wittgenstein’s views, and one about his own take on philosophy.

"Art and the 'Object of Art'" was originally in Mind in 1951, and takes apart the claim, made by prominent philosophers in the 1930s-1950s, that "the painting is not the work of art." This paper is reprinted in other places as well, notably William Elton's famous collection Aesthetics and Language, which put aestheticians on notice that the analytics had shown up to clean house. "The Task of Defining a Work of Art" has been anthologized at least three times. It is the most sophisticated of the "you can’t define art" papers in the apply-Wittgenstein/ordinary language analysis years. "Reasons in Art Criticism" was in the two best aesthetics anthologies of the 60s, the ones edited by Kennick and by Margolis. It was also in the Bobbs-Merrill Reprint Series in Philosophy, which was a selection of the most talked about articles in the 50s and 60s. George Dickie devoted a chapter of his book Evaluating Art to Ziff's view about reasons why a work of art is good, and, 30 years after it was first published, he said it "remains one of the few truly stimulating pieces by present-day philosophers on the theory of art evaluation."

Many students know Paul Ziff from the philosophy of mind papers in Philosophic Turnings. "The Feelings of Robots", in which Ziff argued with his typical panache that robots could not have feelings, has attracted the most attention: viz., replies, reprintings, and inclusion on course reading lists. It went from Analysis in 1959, along with replies by Jack and Ninian Smart, to Alan Ross Anderson’s volume Minds and Machines in 1964, which was part of Prentice Hall’s Contemporary Perspectives in Philosophy Series, and the first "can machines think" collection. People who have written on this topic, such as Keith Gunderson, invariably bring up Ziff's short paper. It eventually showed up in introductory anthologies as well.

"About Behaviorism", another Analysis paper, discusses two bad arguments against philosophical behaviorism in order to show the difference between, as Vere Chappell put it, crude and refined behaviorism. Chappell included this paper in his anthology The Philosophy of Mind, which came out in 1962 and was the first collection of readings on that area of philosophy. "The Simplicity of Other Minds" comes from The Journal of Philosophy. It was originally an invited symposium paper at the American Philosophical Association’s Eastern Division meeting in 1965. The commentators were Sydney Shoemaker and Alvin Plantinga. Ziff went at the other minds problem by taking it as a question about picking the best explanatory hypothesis. According to Hilary Putnam, Ziff was extending the "empirical realist reply to skepticism." In his 21-page paper about Ziff's view, "Other Minds" (1972), Putnam discussed both Ziff's argument and his commentators’ criticisms, and said that he and Ziff were in "essential agreement" on how to solve the other minds problem, and in "common disagreement with the modish treatment in terms of" criteria, analogies, and language learning.

"Understanding Understanding" came out in 1972, Ziff's second year at UNC. It has eight papers, all of them concerned with what had now become his main topic in the philosophy of language: viz., "how one understands what is said." He had, to some extent, written about this in his previous book, where three essays took up how to handle deviant, ungrammatical, and ambiguous utterances. Ziff was, before cognitive science came around the bend, virtually the only one working on how people really speak. Claims about truth conditions, reference, and speech acts were the center of attention back then. As I put it in my review in Metaphilosophy, "lacking in both current linguistic theory and philosophy of language is any useful conception of how people talk". "Understanding Understanding" began to develop such a conception, factor by relevant factor. Zeno Vendler said that "in spite of Ziff’s own modest assessment of the results, it still represents the most interesting, and most important, recent work on the problem of understanding speech".

Two essays are criticisms, taking on Grice’s original attempt to connect what a sentence means and what a speaker intends, and then Quine’s concept of stimulus meaning. The former was first in Analysis, the latter in The Philosophical Review. A. J. Ayer thought the paper on Grice was one of the better critical pieces he had read in a number of years. The reviewer for Philosophia was discouraged "to find later elaborations of Grice’s theory (e.g., Schiffer’s) failing to respond to this essay originally published in 1967". Two essays are about how natural languages differ from formal languages, and how one should view talk about the logical structure of English sentences, which was in vogue then, in large part because of the hoopla about Chomskyan deep structures and a new interest (à la Davidson, Montague, and Parsons) in event sentences and indirect discourse. In "Understanding", Ziff presented an analytical data processing-systematic synthesis view of understanding what people say. The most important chapters - "What Is Said", "There’s More To Seeing Than Meets the Eye", and "Something About Conceptual Schemes" - are about, in their various ways, how levels of abstraction are involved in understanding what people say, as with Ziff's famous example of someone saying that a cheetah can outrun a man. Ziff was the first philosopher to appreciate this phenomenon.

=== Books ===
Semantic Analysis came out in 1960, and by 1967 it had gone through five printings in hardbound and was also appearing in paperback. The book goes back to Ziff's work in aesthetics. As far back as graduate school, he was thinking about the reasons why a work of art is either good or bad, and so he was interested in determining what the phrase 'good painting' means. From there, he went on to determine what the word 'good' means in English: viz., "answering to certain interests". And then all the way to "an informal introduction to and sketch of a rigorous semantic theory" that would be adequate for "determining a method and a means of evaluating and choosing between competing analyses of words and utterances". In short, for confirming claims that a word had this meaning or that, like the word 'good'. This "sketch" did not strike everyone as all that informal since he ends up at a set of conditions under which a morphological element has meaning in English, and it does so, for openers, in terms of the distributive and contrastive sets for the element.

Semantic Analysis stared down, as it were, questions of meaning more seriously than any previous philosophy book. It brought ideas from structural linguistics (even some from the new generative grammars) right into philosophers’ discussions of what this or that word means with the goal of actually coming to a conclusion that could be sensibly defended. Some philosophers did not like getting this real (e.g., G. E. M. Anscombe, not surprisingly). Others did. Paul Benacerraf pointed out how it was "the first systematic attempt to write on these questions", and Jerrold Katz called it "a pioneer work, in that it is the first to propose an empirically based theory of meaning to deal systematically with the various topics that are part of the subject of meaning, and to attempt to fit such a theory into the larger framework of structural linguistics". William Alston said that "future progress in semantics may go through Ziff’s book, or it may recoil from it in another direction. But to ignore it will be impossible". Jonathan Cohen said, back in the early 60s, the last chapter "is one of the best discussions of the word 'good' that has ever been published". It still is, forty years later. In a recent survey of the past fifty years of philosophy, Hilary Putnam makes a point of mentioning how important Semantic Analysis was, and remarks that the "Ziffian image of meanings as a recursive system" became part of "all of our philosophical vocabularies" in the early 60s, along with Chomsky's ideas about recursive syntactic structures. The "our" here refers to the young analytic philosophers, principally on the East coast, and specifically then at Princeton. Putnam adds, in a footnote, all of today's graduate students should also realize that it was Ziff, and not Donald Davidson, who came up with the recursive idea in semantic analysis.

Semantic Analysis holds a record for Ziff's six books. It received the longest review, going 18 pages in Language in 1962. Antiaesthetics is in second place. The review in the Canadian Journal of Philosophy (1987) is 15 pages long, and explained many features of Antiaesthetics. The book had two big topics, and Ziff wrote in a more traditionally sustained and explicit way about one of them, anti-art and its spin-off, anti-aesthetics. It took him back to defining art – what counts as art – and what to say about new things that lacked features of previous art. Ziff thought they could be art, even if they involved "the total rejection of present aspects of art". More generally, he thought "anything that can be viewed is a fit object for aesthetic attention", and none is "more fit than others". The second big topic was not entirely new for Ziff either. It had shown up, for example, in Understanding Understanding, and I called it in my review in Metaphilosophy, "a moral concerning limitations of analysis", and asked if it meant that analyzing things wouldn’t help you understand what is said, or if you simply can’t analyze the complexities. Ziff repeatedly discussed this in Antiaesthetics, and he remarked, and illustrated essay by essay, that we don’t have and may never have good analyses - standard necessary and sufficient conditions, the philosopher's effective procedures or algorithms - for understanding one thing after another about art. He wrote about this again in his paper "Remarks About Judgements, Painters, and Philosophers", which appeared in 1987 in The Journal of Aesthetics and Art Criticism.

J. M. Hanson, his second book (from 1962) is not a philosophy book. Hanson was an English painter who came to Cornell as a professor of art in 1945 when he was 45 years old. He was Paul Ziff's teacher during his B.F.A. degree years, and this book has one color and 32 black-and-white plates of Hanson's paintings (oil on canvas). Ziff introduced the plates with an essay about Hanson's background and style. He called Hanson an "English Romantic" who worked in "the tradition of cubism and geometric abstraction" to produce "images of clarity" that were "neither rough nor loud" nor large like fashionable works from, say, abstract expressionists.

Philosophic Turnings appeared in 1966, went through a number of printings in hardback, and was translated into Italian in 1969. It is subtitled "Essays in Conceptual Appreciation", includes 13 papers (12 previously published), and has some of Ziff's classic papers from the period 1951–1966, especially about art and mental issues. It starts with, as Helen Cartwright put it in her review, "Ziff’s quite substantial work in aesthetics". Paul Ziff was one of the few philosophers in the past fifty years - you can count them on one hand - who had a name both inside and outside of aesthetics. As one reviewer said, he is "one of the more provocative thinkers in the field of aesthetics today, and has helped to re-establish the status of aesthetics in philosophy by introducing a new series of questions in the arts".

Epistemic Analysis came out with Reidel in 1984, but Ziff started it back in 1962 when he was in Rome for the year on a Guggenheim Fellowship. He stalled well into the manuscript, and didn’t start writing again until the early 1980s. The book has a subtitle: "A Coherence Theory of Knowledge". Most of it was never published before. It only contains material from two published papers, one in Linguistics and Philosophy on coherence, and one in Studies in Language on reference. Epistemic Analysis goes at the word 'know' like Semantic Analysis went at the word 'good', and it may be, to use Jonathan Cohen's line, one of the best discussions of 'know' that has been published. Gilbert Harman called it a "brilliant, difficult book", "rich with insights about the passive construction in English, reference, hypostasis, evidence, and many other subjects", as well as "marvelously written, philosophical poetry". Other reviews used words like "rich", "provocative", "iconoclastic", "bold", "subtle, interesting, inventive and stylishly written", with "a fascinating line of anti-skeptical argument" from an author of "undoubted acumen and insight".

The book went against the grain and did not extend the usual ideas. It did not have any of the "justified, true belief" analysis and the search for a fourth condition to patch it up, or talk about varieties of foundationalism, externalism or internalism, let alone the merits of naturalizing. Indeed, Ziff never mentioned Gettier or most of the usual crowd then - say Goldman, Harman, Dretske, Pollock and Unger; a few pages are on Nozick. He maintained that it was senseless to speak about a justified belief, that "neither knowledge nor belief either require or can accept justification", that you did not need evidence to "know that p", or need to believe that p, that 'know' is univocal and means, at bottom, you are in a position to know, no matter whether it is knowing that p, how to do something, or knowing a person, that knowing something (or someone) always counts as an increase in "global coherence" compared to not, and that "coherence is a matter of logical structure". Ziff's coherence view differs from the other coherentists (Lehrer, BonJour, Rescher). He stated his analysis of the philosopher's favorite, knows that p, like this: "one knows that p if and only if p is true, and one is in a position such that, in that position, any possibility of one’s being in error with respect to the truth of p may be safely discounted". This is a fallibilist analysis and Ziff used it to counter skepticism in terms of a technical notion, a safe position, "in which the possibility of error may safely be discounted".

Antiaesthetics was his second book with Reidel, and it also came out in 1984. The book is subtitled "An Appreciation of the Cow with the Subtile Nose", which refers to Jean Dubuffet’s painting in the Metropolitan Museum. There is a page-size picture of this painting at the start of the book and Ziff discussed it at length in places. It is an example of what he called "antiart". The book has eight previously published papers from 1972–1981 and three unpublished ones. "The Cow on the Roof" was an invited symposium paper at the American Philosophical Association's Eastern Division, and came out in The Journal of Philosophy, along with comments by Kendall Walton and Guy Sircello. It is about the identity of a piece of music and Ziff emphasized the idea that pieces of music have variants. Ziff first wrote on this topic in his critical review of Goodman's "Languages of Art" in The Philosophical Review (1971). "Art and Sociobiology" was in Mind in 1981, and was another first: viz., a serious philosopher taking a biological view of aesthetic practices and ideas such as appreciating and intrinsic value. Ziff combined the sociobiology with his notion of "aspection" and person-act-entity-conditions approach from his early paper, "Reasons in Art Criticism". Other papers were invited for conferences and their proceedings - on sports, dance, Wittgenstein, and literature - and a Reidel festschrift. One appeared in a book about philosophy along with similar papers by Ayer, Feyerabend, Popper, and Quine, among others. One chapter, "Anything Viewed", was reprinted in an Oxford Reader in aesthetics in 1997.

== Works ==
- "Art and the Object of Art" (1951)
- "The Task of Defining a Work of Art" (1953)
- "Reasons in Art Criticism" (1958)
- "About Behaviourism" (1958)
- "The Feelings of Robots" (1959)
- "On What a Painting Represents" (1960)
- "Semantic Analysis" (1960)
- "On Understanding Understanding Utterances" (1964)
- "The Simplicity of Other Minds" (1965)
- "On H.P. Grice’s Account of Meaning" (1967)
- "What is Said" (1972)
- "Understanding Understanding" (1972)
- "The Cow on the Roof" (1973)
- "About Proper Names" (1977)
- "Anything Viewed" (1979)
- "Art and Sociobiology" (1981)

== See also ==
- American philosophy
- List of American philosophers
