= TimeML =

Specification for markup of documents wrt. events

TimeML is a set of rules for encoding documents electronically. It is defined in the TimeML Specification version 1.2.1 developed by several efforts, led in large part by the Laboratory for Linguistics and Computation at Brandeis University.

The TimeML project's goal is to create a standard markup language for temporal events in a document. TimeML addresses four problems regarding event markup, including time stamping (with which an event is anchored to a time), ordering events with respect to one another, reasoning with contextually underspecified temporal expressions, and reasoning about the length of events and their outcomes.

== History ==
TimeML was conceptualized in 2002 during the TERQAS (Time and Event Recognition for Question Answering Systems) workshops, organized by Professor James Pustejovsky of Brandeis University. The TERQAS Workshops set out to address the problem of how to enhance natural language question answering systems to answer temporally-based questions about the events and entities in news articles. During these workshops, TimeML version 1.0 was defined, and the TimeBank corpus was created as an illustration.

In 2003, the TANGO (TimeML Annotation Graphical Organizer) workshops produced a graphical annotation tool for TimeML.

The TARSQI (Temporal Awareness and Reasoning Systems for Question Interpretation) project currently develops algorithms that tag events and time expressions in natural language texts, anchor them temporally, and order them.

=== Versions ===
According to the official TimeML website, there are currently three versions of the TimeML specification language, although it is rumored that other versions exist.

==== Version 1.1 ====
TimeML version 1.1 was produced in 2004.

==== Version 1.2 ====
TimeML version 1.2 was produced in 2004, shortly after the release of version 1.1.

==== Version 1.2.1 ====
In 2005, version 1.2.1 was defined. There were several changes made to the language, and are described in the version 1.2.1 TimeML guideline as such:

- The nf_morph attribute that was part of MAKEINSTANCE has been changed to pos (part of speech), and the PRESPART, PASTPART, and INFINITIVE elements of nf_morph redistributed to tense.
- The optional syntax attribute was added to SLINK, ALINK, and TLINK. Syntax can be used to hold CDATA, but is generally only used by annotation programs to hold the data that led to the creation of the tag.
- The optional comment attribute was added to all TimeML elements, for the purpose of giving (human) annotators a place to put observations about annotated text.

==== ISO-TimeML ====
ISO-TimeML was presented to the ISO for consideration as a standard in August 2007. It was then revised, voted on, and approved as an international standard by March 2009.

== Work group members ==
- James Pustejovsky of Brandeis University (Editor)
- Rob Gaizauskas
- Graham Katz
- Bob Ingria
- Jose Castaño
- Roser Saurí
- Anna Rumshisky
- Inderjeet Mani
- Antonio Sanfilippo
- Dragomir Radev
- Patrick Hanks
- Marc Verhagen
- Beth Sundheim
- Andrea Setzer
- Frank Schilder
- Jerry Hobbs

== TimeML tags ==
The following tags defined by the TimeML specification version 1.2.1.

=== TIMEML ===
The TIMEML tag is similar to the root tag in an XML document. It declares that the rest of the document surrounded by the TIMEML tag is encoded with TimeML tags.

=== EVENT ===
The EVENT tag is used to annotate those elements in a text that mark the semantic events described by it. Syntactically, EVENTs are typically verbs, although event nominals, such as "crash" in "...killed by the crash", will also be annotated as EVENTs. The EVENT tag is also used to annotate a subset of the states in a document. This subset of states includes those that are either transient or explicitly marked as participating in a temporal relation. See the TimeML annotation guidelines for more details.

=== TIMEX3 ===
The TIMEX3 tag is primarily used to mark up explicit temporal expressions, such as times, dates, durations, etc. It is modeled on Setzer's (2001) TIMEX tag, as well as the TIDES (Ferro, et al. (2002)) TIMEX2 tag. Since it differs both in attribute structure and in use, it seemed best to give it a separate name, which reveals its heritage while at the same time indicating that it is different from its forebears.

=== SIGNAL ===
The SIGNAL tag represents a temporal signal. These are any function words that suggest a particular temporal relationship. Example SIGNALs are: when, in, after.

=== TLINK ===
TLINKS, or Temporal Links establish relationships between two or more events for the purpose of ordering them in time. Temporal links are the most prevalent as they show how the TimeML elements (events and temporal expressions) are temporally related to each other.

=== ALINK ===
Events that are marked as ASPECTUAL introduce an ALINK or Aspectual Link. These links are quite straightforward as they only occur when an aspectual event has another event as an argument. For example, in the sentence "Mary completed the marathon", "completed" is an aspectual event while marathon is an occurrence.

=== SLINK ===
Like the ALINK, SLINKs (Subordinate Links) are only introduced by certain event classes, namely reporting events, intensional events (I ACTION and I STATE), and perception events. Additionally, these events must subordinate another event by taking it as an argument. SLINKs are used essentially to allow for temporal relationships to be given even for events that may or may not have happened. For example, reporting events such as "said" introduce an EVIDENTIAL SLINK. Consider the sentence ""He didn’t even stop,” one witness said". Here the "stop" event is being subordinated by the "said" event.
