= Lexical simplification =

Lexical simplification is a sub-task of text simplification. It can be defined as any lexical substitution task that reduces text complexity.

== See also ==
- Lexical substitution
- Text simplification
