= Notes on Linguistics =

- Discipline: Linguistics
- Language: English

Publication details
- History: 1975-2001
- Publisher: Summer Institute of Linguistics (United States)

Standard abbreviations
- ISO 4: Notes Linguist.

Indexing
- ISSN: 1548-1484

Links
- Journal homepage

Notes on Linguistics was "a quarterly publication of the International Linguistics Department of the Summer Institute of Linguistics." It originated as a subscription journal, from 1975 through 2001, intended to share practical, theoretical, and even administrative information. More specifically, however, it was intended to provide linguistic field workers with "news, reviews, announcements, and articles" stimulating interest in linguistics and helping them stay current with progress in the discipline.
