= Lesk algorithm =

Natural language processing algorithm

The Lesk algorithm is a classical algorithm for word sense disambiguation introduced by Michael E. Lesk in 1986. It operates on the premise that words within a given context are likely to share a common meaning. This algorithm compares the dictionary definitions of an ambiguous word with the words in its surrounding context to determine the most appropriate sense. Variations, such as the Simplified Lesk algorithm, have demonstrated improved precision and efficiency. However, the Lesk algorithm has faced criticism for its sensitivity to definition wording and its reliance on brief glosses. Researchers have sought to enhance its accuracy by incorporating additional resources like thesauruses and syntactic models.

== Overview ==
The Lesk algorithm is based on the assumption that words in a given "neighborhood" (section of text) will tend to share a common topic. A simplified version of the Lesk algorithm is to compare the dictionary definition of an ambiguous word with the terms contained in its neighborhood. Versions have been adapted to use WordNet. An implementation might look like this:

1. for every sense of the word being disambiguated one should count the number of words that are in both the neighborhood of that word and in the dictionary definition of that sense
2. the sense that is to be chosen is the sense that has the largest number of this count.

A frequently used example illustrating this algorithm is for the context "pine cone". The following dictionary definitions are used:

PINE 
1. kinds of evergreen tree with needle-shaped leaves
2. waste away through sorrow or illness

CONE 
1. solid body which narrows to a point
2. something of this shape whether solid or hollow
3. fruit of certain evergreen trees

As can be seen, the best intersection is Pine #1 ⋂ Cone #3 = 2.

== Simplified Lesk algorithm ==
In Simplified Lesk algorithm, the correct meaning of each word in a given context is determined individually by locating the sense that overlaps the most between its dictionary definition and the given context. Rather than simultaneously determining the meanings of all words in a given context, this approach tackles each word individually, independent of the meaning of the other words occurring in the same context.

"A comparative evaluation performed by Vasilescu et al. (2004) has shown that the simplified Lesk algorithm can significantly outperform the original definition of the algorithm, both in terms of precision and efficiency. By evaluating the disambiguation algorithms on the Senseval-2 English all words data, they measure a 58% precision using the simplified Lesk algorithm compared to the only 42% under the original algorithm.

Note: Vasilescu et al. implementation considers a back-off strategy for words not covered by the algorithm, consisting of the most frequent sense defined in WordNet. This means that words for which all their possible meanings lead to zero overlap with current context or with other word definitions are by default assigned sense number one in WordNet."

Simplified LESK Algorithm with smart default word sense (Vasilescu et al., 2004)

function SIMPLIFIED LESK(word,sentence) returns best sense of word

best-sense <- most frequent sense for word
max-overlap <- 0
context <- set of words in sentence
for each sense in senses of word do

signature <- set of words in the gloss and examples of sense
overlap <- COMPUTEOVERLAP (signature,context)
if overlap > max-overlap then

max-overlap <- overlap
best-sense <- sense

end return (best-sense)

The COMPUTEOVERLAP function returns the number of words in common between two sets, ignoring function words or other words on a stop list. The original Lesk algorithm defines the context in a more complex way.

== Criticisms ==
Unfortunately, Lesk’s approach is very sensitive to the exact wording of definitions, so the absence of a certain word can radically change the results. Further, the algorithm determines overlaps only among the glosses of the senses being considered. This is a significant limitation in that dictionary glosses tend to be fairly short and do not provide sufficient vocabulary to relate fine-grained sense distinctions.

A lot of work has appeared offering different modifications of this algorithm. These works use other resources for analysis (thesauruses, synonyms dictionaries or morphological and syntactic models): for instance, it may use such information as synonyms, different derivatives, or words from definitions of words from definitions.

== Lesk variants ==
- Original Lesk (Lesk, 1986)
- Adapted/Extended Lesk (Banerjee and Pederson, 2002/2003): In the adaptive lesk algorithm, a word vector is created corresponds to every content word in the wordnet gloss. Concatenating glosses of related concepts in WordNet can be used to augment this vector. The vector contains the co-occurrence counts of words co-occurring with w in a large corpus. Adding all the word vectors for all the content words in its gloss creates the Gloss vector g for a concept. Relatedness is determined by comparing the gloss vector using the Cosine similarity measure.

There are a lot of studies concerning Lesk and its extensions:

- Wilks and Stevenson, 1998, 1999;
- Mahesh et al., 1997;
- Cowie et al., 1992;
- Yarowsky, 1992;
- Pook and Catlett, 1988;
- Kilgarriff and Rosensweig, 2000;
- Kwong, 2001;
- Nastase and Szpakowicz, 2001;
- Gelbukh and Sidorov, 2004.

== See also ==
- Word-sense disambiguation
