= Tab Mix Plus =

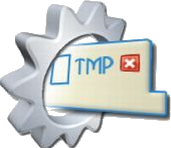

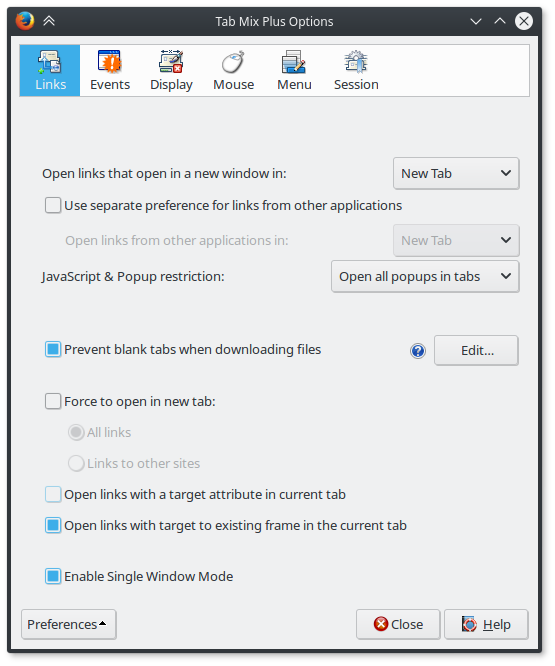
- Tab Mix Plus screenshot
- Original author: Gary Reyes
- Developers: Gary Reyes, onemen, SUN Chun-Yen
- Release: 21 August 2005; 21 years ago
- Stable release: 1.43.0 May 16, 2026; 5 months ago
- Written in: JavaScript
- Operating system: Cross-platform
- Type: Mozilla extension
- License: Mozilla Public License, version 2.0
- Website: Tab Mix Plus onemen.github.io/tabmixplus-docs/
- Repository: github.com/onemen/TabMixPlus

Tab Mix Plus (often abbreviated TMP) is a Mozilla Firefox extension that adds to the tabbed browsing functions in Firefox. It remains regularly updated as of 2026 and is compatible with Waterfox and some other forks. It was a popular extension on Mozilla Add-ons, which records download statistics. TMP is a collection of features from other extensions built in one package. Lifehacker named it one of their "Top 10 must-have Firefox extensions" for 2009. PC World said that "With Tab Mix Plus, Firefox tabs go past the obvious and into the indispensable... it's hard to imagine how you lived without it." As the only extension providing multi-row tab support, Wired and CNET both called it a "must-have" that is "powerful" and "gives you what feels like an infinite amount of control over tab behaviour."

The original Tab Mix Plus ceased to be compatible with older Firefox versions upon the release of Firefox 57 Quantum, due to the switch to the WebExtensions interface. A complete rewrite of the extension under development build has been released

== Functions ==
The Add-Ons functions include:

- Duplicates tabs
  - Opens a new tab with the same page and back/forward history.
- Controls tab focus
  - Allows the user to choose whether new tabs will be selected when created by various events (such as linking, opening bookmarks, etc.).
- Additional rows of tabs
- JavaScript decompiling
  - Allows JavaScript to be forced into a separate tab instead of a pop-up box, and allows the user to view the URL of the JavaScript page.
- Changes handling of input
  - Various combinations of mouse clicks, points, and key-presses can be assigned to activate tab-related functions, such as opening, closing and duplicating individual tabs or groups thereof.
- Reopen closed tabs and windows
  - Saves information about tabs and windows as they are closed, allowing the user to "undo" closing them. The reopened page will reopen in the condition it was at the moment it was closed - including containing any text the user had typed into text boxes thereon - such as those on a Wikipedia edit page.
- Session Manager and Crash Recovery
  - Saves the current set of open windows and tabs (and associated history), at a preset interval and/or on command. This allows the user to recover from a crash, or to deliberately save the current session, to return to it at a later date, or share a copy with another user.
  - While Firefox contains a basic session manager functions, Tab Mix Plus has greater functionality in this area. In turn, the Session Manager extension has additional session management functions beyond those of Tab Mix Plus. These two extensions are known to "play nicely together": Tab Mix Plus detects the presence of Session Manager and deactivates its own session management functions, deferring to Session Manager.

== Versions ==
Two versions of Tab Mix Plus are generally available at any given time:

- An "official release" version
  - Intended for general use, this is publicly available from the Mozilla Add-ons website.
  - These releases have passed the Mozilla Add-ons review process.
- A "development" or "pre-release" version
  - Intended for testing by interested users prior to release, this is available only from the developers' own website.

== Firefox version compatibility ==
Versions of Tab Mix Plus are available for virtually all releases of Firefox prior to Firefox 57.

The release of Firefox 57 Quantum marked the switchover from XUL-based AddOns—which allow extensions to make arbitrary changes to Firefox code—to the WebExtensions API, which strictly limits how much control extensions have over the browser and interface.

A full rewrite to work with modern Firefox was then completed.

== See also ==
- List of Firefox extensions
