= Stochastic semantic analysis =

Approach to language processing in Computer Science

Stochastic semantic analysis is an approach used in computer science as a semantic component of natural language understanding.

Stochastic models generally use the definition of segments of words as basic semantic units for the semantic models, and in some cases involve a two layered approach.

Example applications have a wide range. In machine translation, it has been applied to the translation of spontaneous conversational speech among different languages. In the area of spoken language understanding the fact that spoken sentences often do not follow the grammar of a language and involve self-corrections, repetitions, and other irregularities, the use of stochastic semantic has been suggested as a natural fit to achieve robustness to deal with noise due to the spontaneous nature of spoken language.
