= Word sense =

One of the meanings of a word

In linguistics, a word sense is one of the meanings of a word. For example, the word "play" may have over 50 senses in a dictionary, each with a distinct meaning depending on the context of the word's usage in a sentence, as follows:

We went to see the play Romeo and Juliet at the theater.

The coach devised a great play that put the visiting team on the defensive.

The children went out to play in the park.

In each sentence, different collocates of "play" indicates its different meaning.

Word-sense disambiguation is a process used by people and computers to determine the intended meaning of a word. It relies on context, such as adjacent words, phrases, purpose, the known or probable purpose, and register of the conversation, or document, and orientation, to narrow down the possible senses to the most likely one. This process is context-sensitive.

Advanced semantic analysis has led to a distinction between word senses that correspond to either a seme (the smallest unit of meaning) or a sememe (larger unit of meaning). Polysemy refers to the property of a word or phrase having multiple semes or sememes, resulting in multiple senses.

== Relations between senses ==
In language, words often have related senses within a semantic field, with one sense being broader and another narrower. This pattern is common in technical jargon, where a word may have a narrower sense for a specialized audience compared to a general audience. For example, in linguistics, "orthography" will often be glossed for spelling, casing, spacing, hyphenation, and punctuation, making it a hypernym of "spelling". This pattern is not limited to jargon and can be found in general vocabulary as well. Natural language relies on context for implicit meaning, unlike programming languages that prioritize explicitness about hyponymy and hypernymy, way more than programming languages do, meaning is implicit within a context. Examples include variations in the senses of "wood wool" and "bean" and the following:

- The word "diabetes" without further specification usually refers to diabetes mellitus.
- The word "tinnitus" without further specification usually refers to subjective tinnitus.
- The word "angina" without further specification usually refers to angina pectoris.
- The word "tuberculosis" without further specification usually refers to pulmonary tuberculosis.
- The word "emphysema" without further specification usually refers to pulmonary emphysema.
- The word "cervix" without further specification usually refers to the uterine cervix.

Usage labels of "sensu" plus a qualifier, such as "sensu stricto" ("in the strict sense") or "sensu lato" ("in the broad sense"), are used to specify the intended meaning in a text.

== Relation to etymology ==
Polysemy refers to the phenomenon where a word or phrase has multiple related meanings stemming from a common historical origin. In the medical field, broad terms are often followed by qualifiers to specify certain conditions or anatomical locations, making them polysemic. Older conceptual words are typically highly polysemic, often extending beyond shades of similar meanings into ambiguity.

Homonymy refers to the phenomenon where two distinct words (lexemes) share the same spelling and pronunciation.

== See also ==
- denotation – the literal meaning of an expression
- semantics – the study of meaning
- lexical semantics – the study of the meaning of words in a language and how they convey this meaning
- word-sense induction – the task of automatically associating a word with its intended meaning in a given context
- lexical substitution – the task of replacing a word in context with a lexical substitute
- sememe – unit of meaning
- sense and reference
- functor – a mathematical term which is the overarching generalization of the intentionality behind the class of transfers of intelligibility at two different levels of analysis.
