= ISO-TimeML =

ISO/TC37 standard for time and event markup and annotation

ISO 24617-1:2009, ISO-TimeML is the International Organization for Standardization ISO/TC37 standard for time and event markup and annotation. The scope is standardization of principles and methods relating to the annotation of temporal events in the contexts of electronic documentation and language.

== Objectives of ISO-TimeML ==
The goals of ISO-TimeML are to provide a common model for the creation and use of temporal and event annotation, as a means of managing time-related data within documents, and to enable later categorization and data extraction with use of this meta-data.

== History of ISO-TimeML ==
ISO-TimeML was presented to the ISO for consideration as a standard in August 2007. In this presentation, the preliminaries of ISO-TimeML were outlined, and potential applications were examined. In the following year, revisions were made to ISO-TimeML as the standard transitioned from a New Project (NP) to a Working Project (WP). The ISO-TimeML voting period began in October 2008 and was approved as an international standard by March 2009.

== ISO-TimeML as one of the members of the ISO/TC37 family of standards ==
The ISO/TC37 standards are currently elaborated as high level specifications and deal with word segmentation (ISO 24614), annotations (ISO 24611 a.k.a. MAF, ISO 24612 a.k.a. LAF, ISO 24615 a.k.a. SynAF, and ISO 24617-1 a.k.a. SemAF/Time), feature structures (ISO 24610), multimedia containers (ISO 24616 a.k.a. MLIF), and lexicons (ISO 24613 a.k.a. LMF). These standards are based on low level specifications dedicated to constants, namely data categories (revision of ISO 12620), language codes (ISO 639), scripts codes (ISO 15924), country codes (ISO 3166) and Unicode (ISO 10646).

The two level organization forms a coherent family of standards with the following common and simple rules:

- the high level specification provides structural elements that are adorned by the standardized constants;
- the low level specifications provide standardized constants as metadata.

== Work group members ==
Joint work between ISO/TC 37/SC 4/WG 2 (TDG 3) and the TimeML Working Group that was agreed on at the TDG 3 and LIRICS Working Group Meeting, USC/ISI, Marina del Rey, CA, U.S.A., 2006-04-20/21/22.

Proposed Project Leaders and Editors:

- James Pustejovsky (editor)
- Kiyong Lee (co-editor)
- Harry Bunt
- Branmir Boguraev
- Nancy Ide
