= Semantic analysis (machine learning) =

Machine learning method for concept approximation

In machine learning, semantic analysis of a text corpus is the task of building structures that approximate concepts from a large set of documents. It generally does not involve prior semantic understanding of the documents.

Semantic analysis strategies include:

- Metalanguages based on first-order logic, which can analyze the speech of humans.
- Understanding the semantics of a text is symbol grounding: if language is grounded, it is equal to recognizing a machine-readable meaning. For the restricted domain of spatial analysis, a computer-based language understanding system was demonstrated.
- Latent semantic analysis (LSA), a class of techniques where documents are represented as vectors in a term space. A prominent example is probabilistic latent semantic analysis (PLSA).
- Latent Dirichlet allocation, which involves attributing document terms to topics.
- n-grams and hidden Markov models, which work by representing the term stream as a Markov chain, in which each term is derived from preceding terms.

== Stochastic semantic analysis ==
Stochastic semantic analysis is an approach used in computer science as a semantic component of natural language understanding.

Stochastic models generally use the definition of segments of words as basic semantic units for the semantic models, and in some cases involve a two layered approach.

Example applications have a wide range. In machine translation, it has been applied to the translation of spontaneous conversational speech among different languages. In the area of spoken language understanding the fact that spoken sentences often do not follow the grammar of a language and involve self-corrections, repetitions, and other irregularities, the use of stochastic semantic has been suggested as a natural fit to achieve robustness to deal with noise due to the spontaneous nature of spoken language.

== See also ==
- Explicit semantic analysis
- Information extraction
- Semantic similarity
- Stochastic semantic analysis
- Ontology learning
