= Semantic analysis (linguistics) =

Linguistic methodology

In linguistics, semantic analysis is the process of relating syntactic structures, from the levels of words, phrases, clauses, sentences and paragraphs to the level of the writing as a whole, to their language-independent meanings. It also involves removing features specific to particular linguistic and cultural contexts, to the extent that such a project is possible. The elements of idiom and figurative speech, being cultural, are often also converted into relatively invariant meanings in semantic analysis. Semantics, although related to pragmatics, is distinct in that the former deals with word or sentence choice in any given context, while pragmatics considers the unique or particular meaning derived from context or tone. To reiterate in different terms, semantics is about universally coded meaning, and pragmatics, the meaning encoded in words that is then interpreted by an audience.

Semantic analysis can begin with the relationship between individual words. This requires an understanding of lexical hierarchy, including hyponymy and hypernymy, meronomy, polysemy, synonyms, antonyms, and homonyms. It also relates to concepts like connotation in semiotics and collocation, which is the particular combination of words that can be or frequently are surrounding a single word. This can include idioms, metaphor, and simile, like, "white as a ghost."

With the availability of enough material to analyze, semantic analysis can be used to catalog and trace the style of writing of specific authors.

== See also ==
- Lexical analysis
- Discourse analysis
- Semantic analysis (machine learning)
- Literal and figurative language
- Translation
- Semantic structure analysis
- Sememe
