= ISLRN =

The ISLRN or International Standard Language Resource Number is Persistent Unique Identifier for Language Resources.

== Context ==
On November 18, 2013, 12 major organisations (see list below) from the fields Language Resources and Technologies, Computational Linguistics, and Digital Humanities held a cooperation meeting in Paris (France) and agreed to announce the establishment of the International Standard Language Resource Number (ISLRN), to be assigned to each Language Resource.

Among the 12 organisations, 4 institutions constitute the ISLRN Steering Committee (ST)

- ADHO
- ACL
- Asian Federation of Natural Language Processing ST
- COCOSDA, International Committee for the Coordination & Standardisation of Speech Databases and Assessment Techniques
- ICCL (COLING)
- European Data Forum
- ELRA ST
- IAMT, International Association for Machine Translation
- ISCA
- LDC ST
- Oriental COCOSDA ST
- RMA, Language Resource Management Agency

== Size and Content ==
The Joint Research Centre(JRC), the [European Commission]'s in-house science service, was the first organisation to adopt the ISLRN initiative and requested. 2500 resources and tools have already been allocated an ISLRN. These resources include written data (Annotated corpus, Annotated text, List of misspelled word, Terminological database, Treebank, Wordnet, etc.) and speech corpora (Synthesised Speech, Transcripts and Audiovisual Recordings, Conversational Speech, Folk Sayings, etc.)

== Objectives ==
Providing Language Resources with unique names and identifiers using a standardized nomenclature ensures the identification of each Language Resources and streamlines the citation with proper references in activities within Human Language Technology as well as in documents and scientific publications. Such unique identifier also enhances the reproducibility, an essential feature of scientific work.
