= Computational lexicology =

Computational lexicology is a branch of computational linguistics, which is concerned with the use of computers in the study of lexicon. It has been more narrowly described by some scholars (Amsler, 1980) as the use of computers in the study of machine-readable dictionaries. It is distinguished from computational lexicography, which more properly would be the use of computers in the construction of dictionaries, though some researchers have used computational lexicography as synonymous.

== History ==
Computational lexicology emerged as a separate discipline within computational linguistics with the appearance of machine-readable dictionaries, starting with the creation of the machine-readable tapes of the Merriam-Webster Seventh Collegiate Dictionary and the Merriam-Webster New Pocket Dictionary in the 1960s by John Olney et al. at System Development Corporation. Today, computational lexicology is best known through the creation and applications of WordNet. As the computational processing of the researchers increased over time, the use of computational lexicology has been applied ubiquitously in the text analysis. In 1987, amongst others Byrd, Calzolari, Chodorow have developed computational tools for text analysis. In particular the model was designed for coordinating the associations involving the senses of polysemous words.

=== Study of lexicon ===
Computational lexicology has contributed to the understanding of the content and limitations of print dictionaries for computational purposes (i.e. it clarified that the previous work of lexicography was not sufficient for the needs of computational linguistics). Through the work of computational lexicologists almost every portion of a print dictionary entry has been studied ranging from:

1. what constitutes a headword - used to generate spelling correction lists;
2. what variants and inflections the headword forms - used to empirically understand morphology;
3. how the headword is delimited into syllables;
4. how the headword is pronounced - used in speech generation systems;
5. the parts of speech the headword takes on - used for POS taggers;
6. any special subject or usage codes assigned to the headword - used to identify text document subject matter;
7. the headword's definitions and their syntax - used as an aid to disambiguation of word in context;
8. the etymology of the headword and its use to characterize vocabulary by languages of origin - used to characterize text vocabulary as to its languages of origin;
9. the example sentences;
10. the run-ons (additional words and multi-word expressions that are formed from the headword); and
11. related words such as synonyms and antonyms.

Many computational linguists were disenchanted with the print dictionaries as a resource for computational linguistics because they lacked sufficient syntactic and semantic information for computer programs. The work on computational lexicology quickly led to efforts in two additional directions.

=== Successors to Computational Lexicology ===
First, collaborative activities between computational linguists and lexicographers led to an understanding of the role that corpora played in creating dictionaries. Most computational lexicologists moved on to build large corpora to gather the basic data that lexicographers had used to create dictionaries. The ACL/DCI (Data Collection Initiative) and the LDC (Linguistic Data Consortium) went down this path. The advent of markup languages led to the creation of tagged corpora that could be more easily analyzed to create computational linguistic systems. Part-of-speech tagged corpora and semantically tagged corpora were created in order to test and develop POS taggers and word semantic disambiguation technology.

The second direction was toward the creation of Lexical Knowledge Bases (LKBs). A Lexical Knowledge Base was deemed to be what a dictionary should be for computational linguistic purposes, especially for computational lexical semantic purposes. It was to have the same information as in a print dictionary, but totally explicated as to the meanings of the words and the appropriate links between senses. Many began creating the resources they wished dictionaries were, if they had been created for use in computational analysis. WordNet can be considered to be such a development, as can the newer efforts at describing syntactic and semantic information such as the FrameNet work of Fillmore. Outside of computational linguistics, the Ontology work of artificial intelligence can be seen as an evolutionary effort to build a lexical knowledge base for AI applications.

== Standardization ==
Optimizing the production, maintenance and extension of computational lexicons is one of the crucial aspects impacting NLP. The main problem is the interoperability: various lexicons are frequently incompatible. The most frequent situation is: how to merge two lexicons, or fragments of lexicons? A secondary problem is that a lexicon is usually specifically tailored to a specific NLP program and has difficulties being used within other NLP programs or applications.

To this respect, the various data models of Computational lexicons are studied by ISO/TC37 since 2003 within the project lexical markup framework leading to an ISO standard in 2008.
