= Treebank =

Text corpus with tree annotations

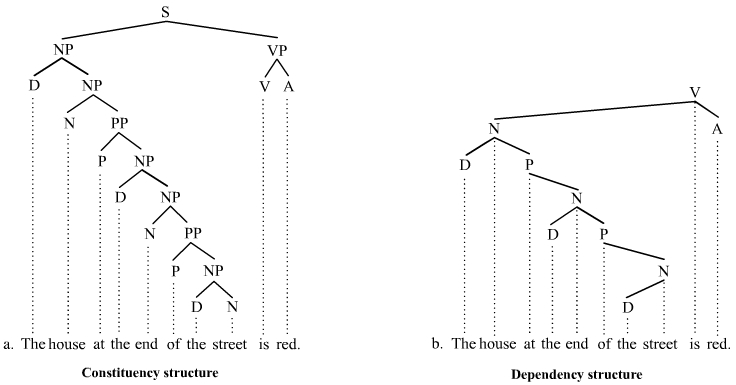
Most syntactic treebanks annotate variants of either phrase structure (left) or dependency structure (right).

In linguistics, a treebank is a parsed text corpus that annotates syntactic or semantic sentence structure. The construction of parsed corpora in the early 1990s revolutionized computational linguistics, which benefitted from large-scale empirical data.

== Etymology ==
The term treebank was coined by linguist Geoffrey Leech in the 1980s, by analogy to other repositories such as a seedbank or bloodbank. This is because both syntactic and semantic structure are commonly represented compositionally as a tree structure. The term parsed corpus is often used interchangeably with the term treebank, with the emphasis on the primacy of sentences rather than trees.

== Construction ==
Treebanks are often created on top of a corpus that has already been annotated with part-of-speech tags. In turn, treebanks are sometimes enhanced with semantic or other linguistic information. Treebanks can be created completely manually, where linguists annotate each sentence with syntactic structure, or semi-automatically, where a parser assigns some syntactic structure which linguists then check and, if necessary, correct. In practice, fully checking and completing the parsing of natural language corpora is a labour-intensive project that can take teams of graduate linguists several years. The level of annotation detail and the breadth of the linguistic sample determine the difficulty of the task and the length of time required to build a treebank.

Example phrase structure tree for John loves Mary

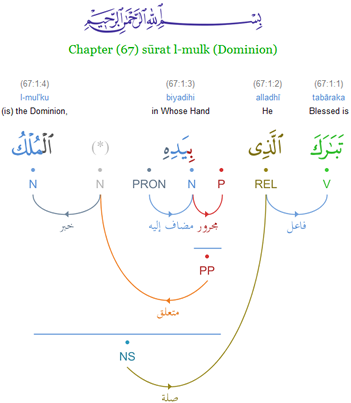
Hybrid constituency/dependency tree from the Quranic Arabic Corpus

Some treebanks follow a specific linguistic theory in their syntactic annotation (e.g. the BulTreeBank follows HPSG) but most try to be less theory-specific. However, two main groups can be distinguished: treebanks that annotate phrase structure (for example the Penn Treebank or ICE-GB) and those that annotate dependency structure (for example the Prague Dependency Treebank or the Quranic Arabic Dependency Treebank).

It is important to clarify the distinction between the formal representation and the file format used to store the annotated data. Treebanks are necessarily constructed according to a particular grammar. The same grammar may be implemented by different file formats. For example, the syntactic analysis for John loves Mary, shown in the figure on the right/above, may be represented by simple labelled brackets in a text file, like this (following the Penn Treebank notation):

(S (NP (NNP John))
   (VP (VPZ loves)
       (NP (NNP Mary)))
   (. .))

This type of representation is popular because it is light on resources, and the tree structure is relatively easy to read without software tools. However, as corpora become increasingly complex, other file formats may be preferred. Alternatives include treebank-specific XML schemes, numbered indentation and various types of standoff notation.

== Applications ==
From a computational linguistics perspective, treebanks have been used to engineer state-of-the-art natural language processing systems such as part-of-speech taggers, parsers, semantic analyzers and machine translation systems. Most computational systems utilize gold-standard treebank data. However, an automatically parsed corpus that is not corrected by human linguists can still be useful. It can provide evidence of rule frequency for a parser. A parser may be improved by applying it to large amounts of text and gathering rule frequencies. However, it should be obvious that only by a process of correcting and completing a corpus by hand is it possible then to identify rules absent from the parser knowledge base. In addition, frequencies are likely to be more accurate.

In corpus linguistics, treebanks are used to study syntactic phenomena (for example, diachronic corpora can be used to study the time course of syntactic change). Once parsed, a corpus will contain frequency evidence showing how common different grammatical structures are in use. Treebanks also provide evidence of coverage and support the discovery of new, unanticipated, grammatical phenomena.

Another use of treebanks in theoretical linguistics and psycholinguistics is interaction evidence. A completed treebank can help linguists carry out experiments as to how the decision to use one grammatical construction tends to influence the decision to form others, and to try to understand how speakers and writers make decisions as they form sentences. Interaction research is particularly fruitful as further layers of annotation, e.g. semantic, pragmatic, are added to a corpus. It is then possible to evaluate the impact of non-syntactic phenomena on grammatical choices.

In linguistics research, annotated treebank data has been used in syntactic research to test linguistic theories of sentence structure against large quantities of naturally occurring examples.

== Semantic treebanks ==
A semantic treebank is a collection of natural language sentences annotated with a meaning representation. These resources use a formal representation of each sentence's semantic structure. Semantic treebanks vary in the depth of their semantic representation. A notable example of deep semantic annotation is the Groningen Meaning Bank, developed at the University of Groningen and annotated using Discourse Representation Theory. An example of a shallow semantic treebank is PropBank, which provides annotation of verbal propositions and their arguments, without attempting to represent every word in the corpus in logical form.

| Language | Treebank | Semantic Formalism | Distribution / License |
|---|---|---|---|
| Chinese | Chinese Universal Propositions | PropBank semantics | CC BY-NC-SA 3.0 US |
| English | Abstract Meaning Representation (AMR) Bank | Deep semantics | ? |
| English | FrameNet | Shallow semantics | ? |
| English | Universal Conceptual Cognitive Annotation (UCCA) | Deep semantics | ? |
| English | Robot Commands Treebank | Deep semantics | ? |
| English | Groningen Meaning Bank | Deep semantics | different licenses |
| English | Parallel Meaning Bank | Deep semantics | different licenses |
| Dutch | Parallel Meaning Bank | Deep semantics | different licenses |
| German | Parallel Meaning Bank | Deep semantics | different licenses |
| Italian | Parallel Meaning Bank | Deep semantics | different licenses |
| English | DeepBank project | Deep semantics | ? |
| English | Treebank Semantics Parsed Corpus | Deep semantics | ? |
| English | RoboCup Corpus | Deep semantics | ? |
| English | Geoquery | Deep semantics | ? |
| English | PropBank | PropBank semantics | different licenses |
| Finnish | Finnish Universal Propositions | PropBank semantics | CC BY-NC-SA 3.0 US |
| Finnish | Finnish PropBank | PropBank semantics | CC BY-SA 4.0 |
| French | French Universal Propositions | PropBank semantics | CC BY-NC-SA 3.0 US |
| German | German Universal Propositions | PropBank semantics | CC BY-NC-SA 3.0 US |
| Italian | Italian Universal Propositions | PropBank semantics | CC BY-NC-SA 3.0 US |
| Portuguese | Portuguese PortLex | PropBank semantics | ? |
| Portuguese | Portuguese Universal Propositions | PropBank semantics | CC BY-NC-SA 3.0 US |
| Spanish | Spanish Universal Propositions | PropBank semantics | CC BY-NC-SA 3.0 US |
| Turkish | Turkish PropBank | PropBank semantics | CC BY-NC-SA 4.0 |

== Syntactic treebanks ==
Many syntactic treebanks have been developed for a wide variety of languages:

| Language | Treebank | Syntactic Formalism | Distribution / License |
|---|---|---|---|
| Abaza | Universal Dependencies, ATB | Dependency_grammar | CC BY-SA |
| Afrikaans | Universal Dependencies, AfriBooms | Dependency | CC BY-SA |
| Akkadian | Universal Dependencies, PISANDUB | Dependency | CC BY-SA |
| Albanian | Universal Dependencies, TSA | Dependency | CC BY-SA |
| Amharic | Universal Dependencies, ATT | Dependency | CC BY-SA |
| Ancient Greek | Universal Dependencies, Perseus | Dependency | CC BY-NC-SA |
| Ancient Greek | Universal Dependencies, PROIEL | Dependency | CC BY-NC-SA |
| Greek (ancient) | Ancient Greek Dependency Treebank | Dependency | Open source (Creative Commons license) |
| Greek (ancient) | PROIEL Treebank | Dependency | Open source (Creative Commons license) |
| Arabic | Columbia Arabic Treebank (CATiB) | Dependency | Linguistic Data Consortium |
| Arabic | Prague Arabic Dependency Treebank (PADT) | Dependency | Linguistic Data Consortium |
| Arabic | Universal Dependencies, NYUAD | Dependency | CC BY-SA |
| Arabic | Universal Dependencies, PADT | Dependency | CC BY-NC-SA |
| Arabic | Universal Dependencies, PUD | Dependency | CC BY-SA |
| Arabic | Penn Arabic Treebank | Phrase structure | Linguistic Data Consortium |
| Armenian | Universal Dependencies, ArmTDP | Dependency | CC BY-SA |
| Assyrian (Neo-Aramaic) | Universal Dependencies, AS | Dependency | CC BY-SA |
| Bambara | Universal Dependencies, CRB | Dependency | CC BY-SA |
| Basque | Universal Dependencies, BDT | Dependency | CC BY-NC-SA |
| Belarusian | Universal Dependencies, HSE | Dependency | CC BY-SA |
| Bhojpuri | Universal Dependencies, BhEn | Dependency | CC BY-SA |
| Bhojpuri | Universal Dependencies, BHTB | Dependency | CC BY-SA |
| Breton | Universal Dependencies, KEB | Dependency | CC BY-SA |
| Bulgarian | Universal Dependencies, BTB | Dependency | CC BY-NC-SA |
| Bulgarian | BulTreeBank | HPSG | Freely available for research |
| Buryat | Universal Dependencies, BDT | Dependency | CC BY-SA |
| Cantonese | Universal Dependencies, HK | Dependency | CC BY-SA |
| Catalan | Cat3LB | Phrase structure | Freely available for research |
| Catalan | Universal Dependencies, AnCora | Dependency | GPL |
| Chinese | Sinica Treebank | Case grammar | Not freely available |
| Chinese | Universal Dependencies, CFL | Dependency | CC BY-SA |
| Chinese | Universal Dependencies, GSD | Dependency | CC BY-SA |
| Chinese | Universal Dependencies, GSDSimp | Dependency | CC BY-SA |
| Chinese | Universal Dependencies, HK | Dependency | CC BY-SA |
| Chinese | Universal Dependencies, PUD | Dependency | CC BY-SA |
| Chinese | Penn Chinese Treebank | Phrase structure | Linguistic Data Consortium |
| Chinese | Chinese Dependency Treebank | Dependency | Linguistic Data Consortium |
| Arabic (classical) | Quranic Arabic Dependency Treebank (QADT) (Quranic Arabic Corpus) | Dependency | Open source (GNU general public license) |
| Classical Armenian | PROIEL Treebank | Dependency | Open source (Creative Commons license) |
| Coptic | Universal Dependencies, Coptic Scriptorium | Dependency | CC BY |
| Croatian | Croatian Dependency Treebank | Dependency | Open source (Creative Commons license) |
| Croatian | Universal Dependencies, SET | Dependency | CC BY-SA |
| Czech | Prague Dependency Treebank | Dependency | Open source (Creative Commons license) |
| Czech | Universal Dependencies, CAC | Dependency | CC BY-SA |
| Czech | Universal Dependencies, CLTT | Dependency | CC BY-SA |
| Czech | Universal Dependencies, FicTree | Dependency | CC BY-NC-SA |
| Czech | Universal Dependencies, PDT | Dependency | CC BY-NC-SA |
| Czech | Universal Dependencies, PUD | Dependency | CC BY-SA |
| Danish | Danish Dependency Treebank | Dependency | Open source (GNU general public license) |
| Danish | Arboretum: A syntactic tree corpus of Danish | Phrase structure | License fee |
| Danish | Universal Dependencies, DDT | Dependency | CC BY-SA |
| Danish | Universal Dependencies, DTB | Dependency | CC BY-SA |
| Dutch | Spoken Dutch Corpus (CGN) | Phrase structure | License fee |
| Dutch | Universal Dependencies, Alpino | Dependency | CC BY-SA |
| Dutch | Universal Dependencies, LassySmall | Dependency | CC BY-SA |
| Dutch | LASSY Small and Large | Dependency | License fee |
| Dutch | Alpino Treebank | Dependency | Open source (GNU general public license) |
| Egyptian | Universal Dependencies, Pre-Coptic (PC) | Dependency | CC BY-SA |
| English | CCGbank | Combinatory categorial grammar | Linguistic Data Consortium |
| English | LinGO Redwoods | HPSG | ? |
| English | Lancaster Parsed Corpus | Phrase structure | ? |
| English | Prague English Dependency Treebank | Dependency | Linguistic Data Consortium |
| English | Universal Dependencies, BhEn | Dependency | CC BY-SA |
| English | Universal Dependencies, ESL | Dependency | CC BY-SA |
| English | Universal Dependencies, EWT | Dependency | CC BY-SA |
| English | Universal Dependencies, GUM | Dependency | CC BY-NC-SA |
| English | Universal Dependencies, GUMReddit | Dependency | CC BY |
| English | Universal Dependencies, LinES | Dependency | CC BY-NC-SA |
| English | Universal Dependencies, ParTUT | Dependency | CC BY-NC-SA |
| English | Universal Dependencies, Pronouns | Dependency | CC BY-SA |
| English | Universal Dependencies, PUD | Dependency | CC BY-SA |
| English | Treebank Semantics Parsed Corpus | Phrase structure | Open source (Creative Commons license) |
| English | Christine Corpus | Phrase structure | Freely available for research |
| English | Lucy Corpus | Phrase structure | Freely available for research |
| English | Susanne Corpus | Phrase structure | Freely available for research |
| English | BLLIP WSJ corpus | Phrase structure | Linguistic Data Consortium |
| English | Tübingen Treebank of English / Spontaneous Speech (TüBa-E/S) | HPSG | Freely available for research |
| English | Diachronic Corpus of Present-Day Spoken English (DCPSE) | Phrase structure | License fee |
| English | British Component of the International Corpus of English (ICE-GB) | Phrase structure | License fee |
| English | The PARC 700 Dependency Bank | Dependency | ? |
| English | Yahoo Query Treebank | Dependency | Freely available for research |
| English | Penn Treebank | Phrase structure | Linguistic Data Consortium |
| English | Multi-Treebank | Phrase structure | Available online for comparison purposes |
| English | CHILDES Brown Eve corpus with dependency annotation | Dependency | Open source (Creative Commons license) |
| English | SMULTRON - Parallel Treebank EN-DE-SV | Phrase structure | Freely available for research |
| Erzya | Universal Dependencies, JR | Dependency | CC BY-SA |
| Estonian | Arborest | Phrase structure | ? |
| Estonian | Syntactically analyzed and disambiguated text corpus | Dependency | Freely available for research |
| Estonian | Universal Dependencies, EDT | Dependency | CC BY-NC-SA |
| Estonian | Universal Dependencies, EWT | Dependency | CC BY-NC-SA |
| Faroese | Universal Dependencies, FarPaHC | Dependency | CC BY-SA |
| Faroese | Universal Dependencies, OFT | Dependency | CC BY-SA |
| Finnish | Turku Dependency Treebank (TDT) | Dependency | Open source (Creative Commons license) |
| Finnish | Universal Dependencies, FTB | Dependency | CC BY |
| Finnish | Universal Dependencies, PUD | Dependency | CC BY-SA |
| Finnish | Universal Dependencies, TDT | Dependency | CC BY-SA |
| French (spoken) | Rhapsodie | Dependency and macrosyntactic annotation | Open source (Creative Commons license) |
| French | L'Arboratoire | Phrase structure | ? |
| French | Universal Dependencies, CrapBank | Dependency | CC BY-SA |
| French | Universal Dependencies, FQB | Dependency | GPL |
| French | Universal Dependencies, FTB | Dependency | GPL |
| French | Universal Dependencies, GSD | Dependency | CC BY-SA |
| French | Universal Dependencies, ParTUT | Dependency | CC BY-NC-SA |
| French | Universal Dependencies, PUD | Dependency | CC BY-SA |
| French | Universal Dependencies, Sequoia | Dependency | GPL |
| French | Universal Dependencies, Spoken | Dependency | CC BY-SA |
| French | French Treebank | Phrase structure | Freely available for research |
| French | Free French Treebank | Phrase structure | Open Source license LGPL-LR |
| French | Sequoia Treebank | Phrase structure & Dependency | Open Source license LGPL-LR |
| Galician | Universal Dependencies, CTG | Dependency | CC BY-NC-SA |
| Galician | Universal Dependencies, TreeGal | Dependency | GPL |
| German | Hamburg Dependency Treebank (HDT) | Dependency | Freely available for research |
| German | Universal Dependencies, GSD | Dependency | CC BY-SA |
| German | Universal Dependencies, LIT | Dependency | CC BY-NC-SA |
| German | Universal Dependencies, PUD | Dependency | CC BY-SA |
| German | SMULTRON - Parallel Treebank EN-DE-SV | Phrase structure | Freely available for research |
| German | NEGRA | Phrase structure | Freely available for research |
| German | TIGER | Phrase structure | Freely available for research |
| German | Tübingen Treebank of German / Spontaneous Speech (TüBa-D/S) | Phrase structure | Freely available for research |
| German | Tübingen Treebank of Written German (TüBa-D/Z) | Phrase structure | Freely available for research |
| German | Tübingen Partially Parsed Corpus of Written German (TüPP-D/Z) | Phrase structure | License fee |
| Gothic | PROIEL Treebank | Dependency | Open source (Creative Commons license) |
| Gothic | Universal Dependencies, PROIEL | Dependency | CC BY-NC-SA |
| Greek | Greek Dependency Treebank | Dependency | Not freely available |
| Greek | Universal Dependencies, GDT | Dependency | CC BY-NC-SA |
| Hebrew | Universal Dependencies, HTB | Dependency | CC BY-NC-SA |
| Hebrew | Hebrew Dependency Treebank | Dependency | Open source (GNU general public license) |
| Hindi English | Universal Dependencies, HIENCS | Dependency | CC BY-SA |
| Hindi | Universal Dependencies, HDTB | Dependency | CC BY-NC-SA |
| Hindi | Universal Dependencies, PUD | Dependency | CC BY-SA |
| Hindi | AnnCorra | Dependency | ? |
| English (historical) | Penn Parsed Corpora of Historical English; | Phrase structure | Linguistic Data Consortium (as of April 2020) |
| English (historical) | York-Toronto-Helsinki Parsed Corpus of Old English Prose (YCOE) | Phrase structure | Freely available for research |
| French (historical) | Corpus MCVF | Phrase structure | Freely available for research |
| Portuguese (historical) | Tycho Brahe corpus | Phrase structure | ? |
| Hungarian | Universal Dependencies, Szeged | Dependency | CC BY-NC-SA |
| Hungarian | Hungarian Treebank | Phrase structure | ? |
| Icelandic | IcePaHC - Icelandic Parsed Historical Corpus | Phrase structure | Open source (GNU Lesser General Public License) |
| Icelandic | Universal Dependencies, IcePaHC | Dependency | CC BY-SA |
| Icelandic | Universal Dependencies, PUD | Dependency | CC BY-SA |
| Indonesian | Universal Dependencies, GSD | Dependency | CC BY-SA |
| Indonesian | Universal Dependencies, PUD | Dependency | CC BY-SA |
| Indonesian | ICON | Phrase structure | ? |
| Irish | Universal Dependencies, IDT | Dependency | CC BY-SA |
| Italian | ISST - Italian Syntactic-Semantic Treebank | Phrase structure and Dependency | License fee |
| Italian | MIDT (Merged Italian Dependency Treebank) resulting from the merging and harmonization of the TUT and ISST-CoNLL/TANL treebanks | Dependency | Freely available for research |
| Italian | VIT - Venice Italian Treebank | Phrase structure and Dependency | License fee |
| Italian | Universal Dependencies, ISDT | Dependency | CC BY-NC-SA |
| Italian | Universal Dependencies, ParTUT | Dependency | CC BY-NC-SA |
| Italian | Universal Dependencies, PoSTWITA | Dependency | CC BY-NC-SA |
| Italian | Universal Dependencies, PUD | Dependency | CC BY-SA |
| Italian | Universal Dependencies, TWITTIRO | Dependency | CC BY-SA |
| Italian | Universal Dependencies, VIT | Dependency | CC BY-NC-SA |
| Italian | Italian Syntactic-Semantic Treebank for the CoNLL-2007 Shared Task (ISST-CoNLL) | Dependency | Freely available for research |
| Italian | SUT - Siena University Treebank | ? | ? |
| Italian | TUT - Turin University Treebank | Dependency | Open source (Creative Commons license) |
| Italian | ISDT (Italian Stanford Dependency Treebank) | Dependency | Freely available for research |
| Japanese | Kyoto Text Corpus | ? | ? |
| Japanese | Universal Dependencies, BCCWJ | Dependency | CC BY-NC-SA |
| Japanese | Universal Dependencies, GSD | Dependency | CC BY-SA |
| Japanese | Universal Dependencies, KTC | Dependency | CC BY-SA |
| Japanese | Universal Dependencies, Modern | Dependency | CC BY-NC-ND |
| Japanese | Universal Dependencies, PUD | Dependency | CC BY-SA |
| Japanese | Keyaki Treebank | Phrase structure | Open source (Creative Commons license) |
| Japanese | Tübingen Treebank of Japanese / Spontaneous Speech (TüBa-J/S) | Phrase structure | Freely available for research |
| Japanese | ATR Dependency corpus | Dependency | ? |
| Karelian | Universal Dependencies, KKPP | Dependency | CC BY-SA |
| Kazakh | Universal Dependencies, KTB | Dependency | CC BY-SA |
| Komi Permyak | Universal Dependencies, UH | Dependency | CC BY-SA |
| Komi Zyrian | Universal Dependencies, IKDP | Dependency | CC BY-SA |
| Komi Zyrian | Universal Dependencies, Lattice | Dependency | CC BY-SA |
| Korean | Universal Dependencies, GSD | Dependency | CC BY-SA |
| Korean | Universal Dependencies, Kaist | Dependency | CC BY-SA |
| Korean | Universal Dependencies, Penn | Dependency | CC BY-SA |
| Korean | Universal Dependencies, PUD | Dependency | CC BY-SA |
| Korean | Universal Dependencies, Sejong | Dependency | CC BY-SA |
| Korean | Korean Treebank | Phrase structure | Linguistic Data Consortium |
| Kurmanji | Universal Dependencies, MG | Dependency | CC BY-SA |
| Latin | Universal Dependencies, ITTB | Dependency | CC BY-NC-SA |
| Latin | Universal Dependencies, LLCT | Dependency | CC BY-SA |
| Latin | Universal Dependencies, Perseus | Dependency | CC BY-NC-SA |
| Latin | Universal Dependencies, PROIEL | Dependency | CC BY-NC-SA |
| Latin | Index Thomisticus Treebank | Dependency | Open source (Creative Commons license) |
| Latin | PROIEL Treebank | Dependency | Open source (Creative Commons license) |
| Latin | Latin Dependency Treebank | Dependency | Open source (Creative Commons license) |
| Latvian | Universal Dependencies, LVTB | Dependency | CC BY-SA |
| Lithuanian | Universal Dependencies, ALKSNIS | Dependency | CC BY-SA |
| Lithuanian | Universal Dependencies, HSE | Dependency | CC BY-SA |
| Livvi | Universal Dependencies, KKPP | Dependency | CC BY-SA |
| Magahi | Universal Dependencies, MGTB | Dependency | CC BY-SA |
| Maltese | Universal Dependencies, MUDT | Dependency | CC BY-SA |
| Marathi | Universal Dependencies, UFAL | Dependency | CC BY-SA |
| Mbya Guarani | Universal Dependencies, Dooley | Dependency | CC BY-NC-SA |
| Mbya Guarani | Universal Dependencies, Thomas | Dependency | CC BY-NC-SA |
| Middle Irish | Universal Dependencies, CritMITB | Dependency | CC BY-SA |
| Middle Irish | Universal Dependencies, DipMITB | Dependency | CC BY-SA |
| Moksha | Universal Dependencies, JR | Dependency | CC BY-SA |
| Naija | Universal Dependencies, NSC | Dependency | CC BY-SA |
| North Sami | Universal Dependencies, Giella | Dependency | CC BY-SA |
| Norwegian | INESS treebanking infrastructure | LFG | ? |
| Norwegian | Universal Dependencies, Bokmaal | Dependency | CC BY-SA |
| Norwegian | Universal Dependencies, Nynorsk | Dependency | CC BY-SA |
| Norwegian | Universal Dependencies, NynorskLIA | Dependency | CC BY-SA |
| Old Church Slavonic | Universal Dependencies, PROIEL | Dependency | CC BY-NC-SA |
| Old Church Slavonic | TOROT Treebank | Dependency | Open source (Creative Commons license) |
| Old French | Universal Dependencies, SRCMF | Dependency | CC BY-NC-SA |
| Old Russian | Universal Dependencies, RNC | Dependency | CC BY-SA |
| Old Russian | Universal Dependencies, TOROT | Dependency | CC BY-NC-SA |
| Old Russian | TOROT Treebank | Dependency | Open source (Creative Commons license) |
| Persian | Persian Dependency Treebank (PerDT) | Dependency | Freely available for research |
| Persian | PerTreeBank | HPSG | Freely available for research |
| Persian | Universal Dependencies, Seraji | Dependency | CC BY-SA |
| Polish | A Treebank / Test Suite for Polish | HPSG | ? |
| Polish | Universal Dependencies, LFG | Dependency | GPL |
| Polish | Universal Dependencies, PDB | Dependency | CC BY-NC-SA |
| Polish | Universal Dependencies, PUD | Dependency | CC BY-SA |
| Polish | Składnica | Phrase structure and Dependency | Open source (GNU general public license) |
| Portuguese | Universal Dependencies, Bosque | Dependency | CC BY-SA |
| Portuguese | Universal Dependencies, GSD | Dependency | CC BY-SA |
| Portuguese | Universal Dependencies, PUD | Dependency | CC BY-SA |
| Portuguese | Projecto Floresta Sintá(c)tica | Dependency, Phrase structure | Open source (GNU general public license) |
| Romanian | Romanian Dependency Treebank | Dependency | ? |
| Romanian | Universal Dependencies, Nonstandard | Dependency | CC BY-SA |
| Romanian | Universal Dependencies, RRT | Dependency | CC BY-SA |
| Romanian | Universal Dependencies, SiMoNERo | Dependency | CC BY-SA |
| Russian | Universal Dependencies, GSD | Dependency | CC BY-SA |
| Russian | Universal Dependencies, PUD | Dependency | CC BY-SA |
| Russian | Universal Dependencies, SynTagRus | Dependency | CC BY-NC-SA |
| Russian | Universal Dependencies, Taiga | Dependency | CC BY-SA |
| Russian | SynTagRus Dependency Treebank (Russian National Corpus) | Dependency | Freely available for research |
| Sanskrit | Universal Dependencies, UFAL | Dependency | CC BY-SA |
| Sanskrit | Universal Dependencies, Vedic | Dependency | CC BY-SA |
| Scottish Gaelic | Universal Dependencies, ARCOSG | Dependency | CC BY-SA |
| Serbian | Universal Dependencies, SET | Dependency | CC BY-SA |
| Sindhi | Universal Dependencies, MazharDootio | Dependency | CC BY-SA |
| Skolt Sami | Universal Dependencies, Giellagas | Dependency | CC BY-SA |
| Slovak | Universal Dependencies, SNK | Dependency | CC BY-SA |
| Slovene | Slovene Dependency Treebank | Dependency | Freely available for research |
| Slovenian | Universal Dependencies, SSJ | Dependency | CC BY-NC-SA |
| Slovenian | Universal Dependencies, SST | Dependency | CC BY-NC-SA |
| Spanish | Cast3LB | Phrase structure and Dependency | Freely available for research |
| Spanish | Universal Dependencies, AnCora | Dependency | GPL |
| Spanish | Universal Dependencies, GSD | Dependency | CC BY-SA |
| Spanish | Universal Dependencies, PUD | Dependency | CC BY-SA |
| Spanish | UAM Treebank of Spanish | Phrase structure | Freely available for research |
| Swedish | Talbanken05 | Phrase structure and Dependency | Freely available for research |
| Swedish | Swedish Treebank | Phrase structure | Freely available for research |
| Swedish | Universal Dependencies, LinES | Dependency | CC BY-NC-SA |
| Swedish | Universal Dependencies, PUD | Dependency | CC BY-SA |
| Swedish | Universal Dependencies, Talbanken | Dependency | CC BY-SA |
| Swedish | SMULTRON - Parallel Treebank EN-DE-SV | Phrase structure | Freely available for research |
| Swedish Sign Language | Universal Dependencies, SSLC | Dependency | CC BY-SA |
| Swiss German | Universal Dependencies, UZH | Dependency | CC BY-SA |
| Tagalog | Universal Dependencies, TRG | Dependency | CC BY-SA |
| Tagalog | Universal Dependencies, Ugnayan | Dependency | CC BY-NC-SA |
| Tamil | Universal Dependencies, TTB | Dependency | CC BY-NC-SA |
| Telugu | Universal Dependencies, MTG | Dependency | CC BY-SA |
| Thai | NAiST Thai Treebank | Dependency | Open source (GNU general public license) |
| Thai | Universal Dependencies, PUD | Dependency | CC BY-SA |
| Thai | THTB | Phrase structure | CC BY 4.0 |
| Turkish | METU-Sabanci Turkish Treebank | Dependency | Freely available for research |
| Turkish | Universal Dependencies, BOUN | Dependency | CC BY-SA |
| Turkish | Universal Dependencies, GB | Dependency | CC BY-SA |
| Turkish | Universal Dependencies, IMST | Dependency | CC BY-NC-SA |
| Turkish | Universal Dependencies, PUD | Dependency | CC BY-SA |
| Ukrainian | Institute for Ukrainian, NGO Gold Standard | Dependency | Open source (Creative Commons license) |
| Ukrainian | Universal Dependencies, IU | Dependency | CC BY-NC-SA |
| Upper Sorbian | Universal Dependencies, UFAL | Dependency | CC BY-SA |
| Urdu | NU-FAST Treebank | Phrase structure | Contact at Computational Learning Strategies & Practices |
| Urdu | The URDU.KON-TB Treebank | Phrase and Hyper Dependency Structure | Contact at Computational Learning Strategies & Practices |
| Urdu | Universal Dependencies, UDTB | Dependency | CC BY-NC-SA |
| Uyghur | Universal Dependencies, UDT | Dependency | CC BY-SA |
| Vietnamese | Universal Dependencies, VTB | Dependency | CC BY-SA |
| Vietnamese | Vietnamese Treebank | Phrase structure | Freely available for research |
| Vietnamese | Vietnamese Dependency Treebank | Dependency | Freely available for research |
| Warlpiri | Universal Dependencies, UFAL | Dependency | CC BY-SA |
| Welsh | Universal Dependencies, CCG | Dependency | CC BY-SA |
| Wolof | Universal Dependencies, WTB | Dependency | CC BY-SA |
| Yoruba | Universal Dependencies, YTB | Dependency | CC BY-SA |

To facilitate the further researches between multilingual tasks, some researchers discussed the universal annotation scheme for cross-languages. In this way, people try to utilize or merge the advantages of different treebanks corpora. For instance, the universal annotation approach for dependency treebanks; and the universal annotation approach for phrase structure treebanks.

== Search tools ==
One of the key ways to extract evidence from a treebank is through search tools. Search tools for parsed corpora typically depend on the annotation scheme that was applied to the corpus. User interfaces range in sophistication from expression-based query systems aimed at computer programmers to full exploration environments aimed at general linguists. Wallis (2008) discusses the principles of searching treebanks in detail and reviews the state of the art around that time.

== See also ==
- Text corpus
- Phrase structure grammar
- Dependency grammar
- Parsing
- Part-of-speech tagging
