= Null instantiation =

Category used to tag absent constituents

In frame semantics, a theory of linguistic meaning, null instantiation is the name of a category used to annotate, or tag, absent semantic constituents or frame elements (Fillmore et al. 2003, Section 3.4). Frame semantics, best exemplified by the FrameNet project, views words as evoking frames of knowledge and frames as typically involving multiple components, called frame elements (e.g. buyer and goods in an acquisition). The term null refers to the fact that the frame element in question is absent. The logical object of the term instantiation refers to the frame element itself. So, null instantiation is an empty instantiation of a frame element. Ruppenhofer and Michaelis postulate an implicational regularity tying the interpretation type of an omitted argument to the frame membership of its predicator: "If a particular frame element role is lexically omissible under a particular interpretation (either anaphoric or existential) for one LU [lexical unit] in a frame, then for any other LUs in the same frame that allow the omission of this same FE [frame element], the interpretation of the missing FE is the same." (Ruppenhofer and Michaelis 2014: 66)

== Definite null instantiation ==
Definite null instantiation is the absence of a frame element that is recoverable from the context. It is similar to a zero anaphor.

== Indefinite null instantiation ==
Indefinite null instantiation is the absence of the object of a potentially transitive verb such as eat or drink.

== Constructional null instantiation ==
Constructional null instantiation is the absence of a frame element due to a syntactic construction, e.g. the optional omission of agents in passive sentences.

== See also ==
- Frame semantics
- Anaphora
- Ellipsis
