= Charles Wayne =

Charles Wayne may refer to:

- Charles Lynn Wayne (1943–2024), American program manager at the Defense Advanced Research Projects Agency
- Charles Stokes Wayne (1858–1920), American writer

== See also ==
- Chuck Wayne (1923–1997, American jazz guitarist
