= UCCA =

UCCA may stand for:

- Universities Central Council on Admissions, which handled applications to UK universities between 1961 and 1993
- Ukrainian Congress Committee of America, a not-for-profit organization represents the interests of America's ethnic Ukrainians
- University College for the Creative Arts, an art school based in England with campuses in Canterbury, Epsom, Farnham, Maidstone and Rochester
- Ullens Center for Contemporary Art, an art center in Beijing founded in 2007 by Guy and Myriam Ullens
- Universal Conceptual Cognitive Annotation, a semantic annotation framework for natural language text
- UCCA Unitarian Christian Church of America formerly the Unitarian Christian Emerging Church
