= Collins English Dictionary =

Printed and online dictionary of English, published by HarperCollins in Glasgow

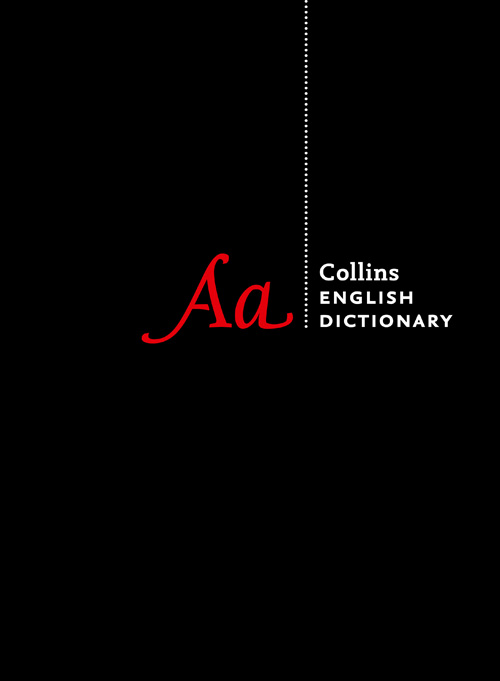
Collins English Dictionary Complete and Unabridged 13th edition

The Collins English Dictionary is a printed and online dictionary of English. It is published by HarperCollins in Glasgow and was first published in 1979.

== Corpus ==
The dictionary uses language research based on the Collins Corpus, which is continually updated and has over 20 billion words.

== Editions ==
- The current edition is the 14th; it was published on 31 August 2023, with more than 732,000 words, meanings, and phrases (not 730,000 headwords) and 9,500 place names and 7,300 biographies. A newer edition of the 14th edition was published on 7 May 2024.
- The previous edition was the 13th edition, which was published in November 2018.
- A special "30th Anniversary" 10th edition was published in 2010.
- Earlier editions were published once every 3 or 4 years.

== History ==
The 1979 edition of the dictionary, with Patrick Hanks as editor and Laurence Urdang as editorial director, was the first British English dictionary to be typeset from the output from a computer database in a specified format. This meant that every aspect of an entry was handled by a different editor using different forms or templates. Once all the entries for an entry had been assembled, they were passed on to be keyed into the slowly assembled dictionary database which was completed for the typesetting of the first edition.

The computer database used for the 1979 edition was donated to the ACL Data Collection Initiative.

In a later edition, they increasingly used the Bank of English established by John McHardy Sinclair at COBUILD to provide typical citations rather than examples composed by the lexicographer.

== CollinsDictionary.com ==
The Collins English Dictionary was published on the web on 31 December 2011 on the freely accessible CollinsDictionary.com, along with the translation dictionaries between English and French, German, Spanish and Italian. The site also includes example sentences showing word usage from the Collins Bank of English Corpus, word frequencies and trends from the Google Ngrams project, and word images from Flickr.

In August 2012, CollinsDictionary.com introduced crowd-sourcing for neologisms, whilst still maintaining overall editorial control to remain distinct from Wiktionary and Urban Dictionary. This followed an earlier launch of a discussion forum for neologisms in 2004.

In May 2015, CollinsDictionary.com added 6,500 new Scrabble words to their Collins Scrabble Words dictionary. The words are based on terms related to and influenced by slang, social media, food, technology, and more.
