= Abstract Meaning Representation =

Semantic representation language

Abstract Meaning Representation (AMR) is a semantic representation language. AMR are rooted, labeled, directed, acyclic graphs (DAGs), comprising whole sentences. They are intended to abstract away from syntactic representations, in the sense that sentences which are similar in meaning should be assigned the same AMR, even if they are not identically worded. By nature, the AMR language is biased towards English – it is not meant to function as an international auxiliary language.

Abstract Meaning Representations have originally been introduced by Langkilde and Knight (1998) as a derivation from the Penman Sentence Plan Language, they are thus continuing a long tradition in Natural Language Generation and this has been their original domain of application. AMRs have re-gained attention since Banarescu et al. (2013), in particular, this includes the extension to novel tasks such as machine translation and natural language understanding. The modern (post-2010) AMR format preserves the syntax and many syntactic conceptions of the original AMR format but has been thoroughly revised to better align with PropBank. Moreover, AMR has been extended with formal conventions for metadata and conventions for entity linking (here, linking with Wikipedia entries).

Existing AMR technology includes tools and libraries for parsing, visualization, and surface generation as well as a considerable number of publicly available data sets. Many of these resources are collected at the AMR homepage at ISI/USC where AMR technology has been originally developed.

== Example ==
Example sentence: The boy wants to go.

(w / want-01
  :arg0 (b / boy)
  :arg1 (g / go-01
    :arg0 b))

As far as predicate semantics are concerned, the role inventory of PropBank is largely based on semantic role annotations in the style of PropBank. Note that in pre-2010 AMR format, `:arg0` would be `:agent`, etc.

Banarescu et al. (2013) claim that this is equivalent to the following logical formula:
$$\exist w, b, g:
instance(w, want\_01) \wedge instance(g, go\_01) \wedge
instance(b, boy) \wedge arg0(w, b) \wedge
arg1(w, g) \wedge arg0(g, b)$$

In addition, they claim that this representation makes the will of the boy more explicit, highlighting that the intention of the boy is that he himself goes away (because `want-01` is the type of the top-level predicate).

== Uniform Meaning Representations ==
In an extension of the original AMR formalism, Uniform Meaning Representations (UMR) have been proposed. While grounded in AMR, they eliminate specific characteristics of the English language that are featured in AMR, and are thus more easily applicable cross-linguistically.
