= Lily Wong Fillmore =

American linguist (1934–2026)

- Born: October 22, 1934; California, U.S.
- Died: October 26, 2026 (aged 92)
- Occupations: Academic, linguist
- Spouse: Charles J. Fillmore (died 2014)

Academic background
- Education: Stanford University
- Thesis: The second time around: Cognitive and social strategies in second language acquisition (1976)

Academic work
- Discipline: Linguist
- Sub-discipline: Second language acquisition

Lily Wong Fillmore (October 22, 1934 – October 26, 2026) was an American linguist. She was a professor in the Graduate School of Education at the University of California, Berkeley. Her research focused on second language learning and teaching and on education in language minority communities.

== Life and career ==
Wong Fillmore was born in Northern California on October 22, 1934, the child of immigrant Chinese parents, and grew up in Watsonville, California. She attributed her interest in second language education to her own experience of starting school not knowing any English, in a community with many immigrants.

She earned a PhD in linguistics from Stanford University in 1976 with a dissertation entitled, "The Second Time Around: Cognitive and social strategies in second language acquisition". In 1974, she became assistant dean for student affairs at UC-Berkeley's Graduate School of Education. She began teaching there as an assistant professor two years later and spent her entire career at UC-Berkeley, attaining the position of Jerome A. Hutto Professor of Education before her retirement in 2004.

Wong Fillmore worked on issues related to education of language minority children in the US since the 1950s, when she was a volunteer teacher in a California migrant labor camp. She conducted several large-scale research projects investigating how children of Asian or Latino background adjust, both linguistically and academically, to the US public school classroom environment. Her research made contributions to several areas related to bilingualism and second language learning: the identification of cognitive and social strategies that children use in acquiring a second language (the topic of her dissertation); sources of variation in second language acquisition (Wong Fillmore 1979, 1983); and the influence of social context and teaching practices on second language acquisition (Wong Fillmore 1985a, b; 1989a, b).

She was married to the American linguist, Charles Fillmore. Wong Fillmore died on October 26, 2026, at the age of 92.

== Publications ==
Her publications include:

- Lily Wong Fillmore. 1979. Individual Differences in Second Language Acquisition. In Individual Differences in Language Ability and Language Behavior. Academic Press, pp. 203–228. https://doi.org/10.1016/B978-0-12-255950-1.50017-2
- Lily Wong Fillmore. 1983. The Language Learner as an Individual. In M. Clarke and J. Handscombe, Eds. Pacific Perspectives on Language Learning and Teaching. Washington, D.C.: TESOL.
- Lily Wong Fillmore. 1985a. When Does Teacher Talk Work as Input? In S. Gass and C. Madden, Eds. Input in Second Language Acquisition.Rowley, MA: Newbury House.
- Lily Wong Fillmore, P. Ammon, B. McLaughlin and M. S. Ammon 1985b. Language Learning through Bilingual Instruction, Final Report to the National Institute of Education. University of California, Berkeley.
- Lily Wong Fillmore. 1989a. Language Learning in Social Context: The View from Research in Second Language learning. In R. Dietrich and C. Graumann, Eds. Language Processing in Social Context, Amsterdam: Elsevier Science Publishers.
- Lily Wong Fillmore. 1989b. Teachability and Second Language Acquisition. In R. Schiefelbusch & M. Rice, Eds. The Teachability of Language. Baltimore, MD: Paul Brookes.
- Lily Wong Fillmore. 1991. When learning a second language means losing the first. Early Childhood Research Quarterly 6, 323-346.
- Lily Wong Fillmore and Catherine E. Snow. 2000. What Teachers Need To Know about Language. Washington, DC: Center for Applied Research.
