= Frame semantics =

Frame semantics can refer to:

- Kripke semantics - semantics for modal logics
- Frame semantics (linguistics) - linguistic theory developed by Charles J. Fillmore
