= Jerome A. Feldman =

American computer scientist

Jerome A. Feldman is professor emeritus of electrical engineering and computer science at the University of California, Berkeley. He is a fellow of the Association for the Advancement of Artificial Intelligence since 1990 and of the American Association for the Advancement of Science since 2005.

== Early life ==
Feldman received a B.S. in Physics from the University of Rochester in 1960, a M.S. in Mathematics from the University of Pittsburgh in 1961, and a Ph.D. in Computer Science and Mathematics from Carnegie Mellon University in 1964.

== Career ==
Feldman began his career at MIT Lincoln Laboratory, where he worked on associative processing. From 1966 to 1974, he served as assistant and later associate professor of computer science at Stanford University, where he was also associate director of the Stanford Artificial Intelligence Lab and conducted research in vision, robotics, probabilistic reasoning, and grammatical inference.

In 1974, Feldman joined the University of Rochester as a founding chair of its Computer Science Department and later served as vice provost. He was appointed the university’s first John H. Dessauer Professor in 1981. In 1988, he became the founding director of the International Computer Science Institute (ICSI) and a professor of electrical engineering and computer science at the University of California, Berkeley, serving as ICSI’s director until 1998. He later directed Berkeley’s Cognitive Science Program.

Feldman’s research has spanned computer science, artificial intelligence, and cognitive science, including work on operator associativity, distributed operating systems, and neural computation. He was an early contributor to the connectionist approach to artificial intelligence and collaborated on the Neural Theory of Language project, which formed the basis of his 2005 book From Molecule to Metaphor.

He is a charter fellow of the Association for the Advancement of Artificial Intelligence (AAAI) and a fellow of the American Association for the Advancement of Science (AAAS). His honors include an honorary doctorate from the University of Rochester (1998) and the Berkeley Citation (2009).

== Selected publications ==
- From Molecule to Metaphor: A Neural Theory of Language. Bradford Books, Cambridge, MA: MIT Press, 2006.
