= Laura Michaelis =

American linguist

Laura A. Michaelis
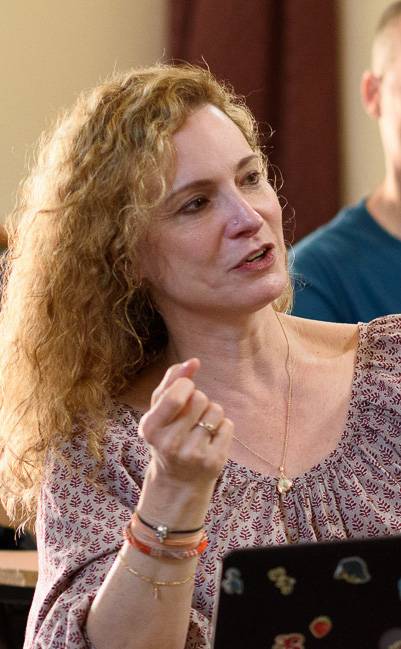
- Education: University of California, Berkeley
- Scientific career
- Fields: Linguistics
- Workplaces: University of Colorado, Boulder
- Doctoral advisor: Charles J. Fillmore
- Website: www.colorado.edu/faculty/michaelis/

Laura A. Michaelis is a Professor in the Department of Linguistics and a faculty fellow in the Institute of Cognitive Science at the University of Colorado Boulder.

== Background and research ==
She received her BA, MA and PhD (1993) in linguistics at the University of California, Berkeley, writing her thesis under the direction of Charles J. Fillmore.

Laura Michaelis' widely cited research centers on the discourse-syntax interface in conversational English and the semantic interaction between words and grammatical constructions, with particular emphasis on the linguistic encoding of tense and aspect. Her work has appeared in a variety of prestigious journals, including Language, Journal of Linguistics, Cognitive Science, Linguistics and Philosophy, Cognitive Linguistics, The Journal of Semantics and The Journal of Pragmatics.

Her recent research focuses on idiomatic language and multi-word expressions, the grammar of English noun phrases, verbal argument structure (Michaelis & Ruppenhofer 2001), nonstandard syntactic amalgams in conversational speech, syntactic innovation and Construction Grammar (Michaelis & Kim 2020).

== Honors ==
In 2022, Michaelis was inducted as a Fellow of the Linguistic Society of America.

She is one of the founding editors of the Cambridge University Press journal Language and Cognition.

== Select works ==
=== Books ===
- Syntactic Constructions in English (w/ Jongbok Kim) Cambridge University Press (2020) ISBN 9781108640671
- Mismatch: Form-Function Incongruity and the Architecture of Grammar (w/ Elaine J. Francis) CSLI Publications (2003) ISBN 1-57586-383-9
- Beyond Alternations: A Constructional Model of the Applicative Construction in German (w/ Josef Ruppenhofer) CSLI Publications (2001) ISBN 9781575863306
- Aspectual Grammar and Past-Time Reference. Routledge (1998) ISBN 0-415-15678-5

=== Other publications ===
- Michaelis, Laura A. 2011. Stative by Construction. Linguistics 49: 1359–1399
- Michaelis, Laura A. 2006. Time and Tense. In B. Aarts and A. MacMahon, (eds.), The Handbook of English Linguistics. Oxford: Blackwell. 220-234.
- Brenier, Jason M. and Laura A. Michaelis. 2005. Optimization via Syntactic Amalgam: Syntax-Prosody Mismatch and Copula Doubling. Corpus Linguistics and Linguistic Theory 1: 45-88.
- Michaelis, Laura A. 2005. Entity and Event Coercion in a Symbolic Theory of Syntax. In J.-O. Oestman and M. Fried, (eds.), Construction Grammar(s): Cognitive Grounding and Theoretical Extensions. Constructional Approaches to Language, Volume 3. Amsterdam: Benjamins. 45-88.
- Michaelis, Laura A. 2004. Type Shifting in Construction Grammar: An Integrated Approach to Aspectual Coercion. Cognitive Linguistics 15: 1-67.
