= SPL notation =

SPL (Sentence Plan Language) is an abstract notation representing the semantics of a sentence in natural language. In a classical Natural Language Generation (NLG) workflow, an initial text plan (hierarchically or sequentially organized factoids, often modelled in accordance with Rhetorical Structure Theory) is transformed by a sentence planner (generator) component to a sequence of sentence plans modelled in a Sentence Plan Language. A surface generator can be used to transform the SPL notation into natural language sentences.

Probably the most widely used SPL language used today (2022) is AMR (Abstract Meaning Representation, see there for further references), but is owes parts of its popularity to its application to NLP problems other than NLG, e.g., machine translation and semantic parsing.

== See also ==
- Natural language generation
