= Quranic Arabic Corpus =

Annotated linguistic resource

- Research center: University of Leeds
- Initial release: November 2009
- Language: Quranic Arabic, English
- Annotation: Syntax, morphology
- Framework: Dependency grammar
- License: GNU General Public License
- Website: https://corpus.quran.com/

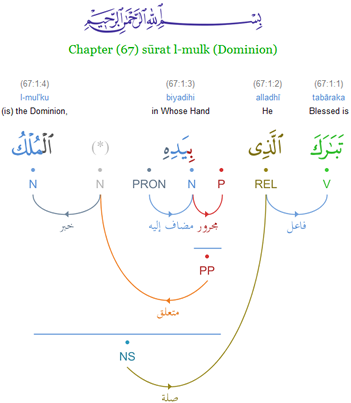
Dependency syntax tree for verse (67:1)

The Quranic Arabic Corpus (Arabic: المدونة القرآنية العربية, romanized: al-mudawwana al-Qurʾāni al-ʿArabiyya) is an annotated linguistic resource consisting of 77,430 words of Quranic Arabic. The project aims to provide morphological and syntactic annotations for researchers wanting to study the language of the Quran.

== Functions ==
The grammatical analysis helps readers further in uncovering the detailed intended meanings of each verse and sentence. Each word of the Quran is tagged with its part-of-speech as well as multiple morphological features. Unlike other annotated Arabic corpora, the grammar framework adopted by the Quranic Corpus is the traditional Arabic grammar of i'rab (إﻋﺮﺍﺏ). The research project is led by Kais Dukes at the University of Leeds, and is part of the Arabic language computing research group within the School of Computing, supervised by Eric Atwell.

The annotated corpus includes:

- A manually verified part-of-speech tagged Quranic Arabic corpus.
- An annotated treebank of Quranic Arabic.
- A novel visualization of traditional Arabic grammar through dependency graphs.
- Morphological search for the Quran.
- A machine-readable morphological lexicon of Quranic words into English.
- A part-of-speech concordance for Quranic Arabic organized by lemma.
- An online message board for community volunteer annotation.

Corpus annotation assigns a part-of-speech tag and morphological features to each word. For example, annotation involves deciding whether a word is a noun or a verb, and if it is inflected for masculine or feminine. The first stage of the project involved automatic part-of-speech tagging by applying Arabic language computing technology to the text. The annotation for each of the 77,430 words in the Quran was then reviewed in stages by two annotators, and improvements are still ongoing to further improve accuracy.

Linguistic research for the Quran that uses the annotated corpus includes training Hidden Markov model part-of-speech taggers for Arabic, automatic categorization of Quranic chapters, and prosodic analysis of the text.

In addition, the project provides a word-by-word Quranic translation based on accepted English sources, instead of producing a new translation of the Qur'an.

== See also ==
- Corpus linguistics
- Quran
- Classical Arabic
- Treebank
