= AFNLP =

Asian Federation of Natural Language Processing Associations

AFNLP (Asian Federation of Natural Language Processing Associations) is the organization for coordinating the natural language processing related activities and events in the Asia-Pacific region.

== Foundation ==
AFNLP was founded on 4 October 2000.

== Member Associations ==
- ALTA – Australasian Language Technology Association
- ANLP Japan Association of Natural Language Processing
- ROCLING Taiwan ROC Computational Linguistics Society
- SIG-KLC Korea SIG-Korean Language Computing of Korea Information Science Society

== Existing Asian Initiatives ==
- NLPRS: Natural Language Processing Pacific Rim Symposium
- IRAL: International Workshop on Information Retrieval with Asian Languages
- PACLING: Pacific Association for Computational Linguistics
- PACLIC: Pacific Asia Conference on Language, Information and Computation
- PRICAI: Pacific Rim International Conference on AI
- ICCPOL: International Conference on Computer Processing of Oriental Languages
- ROCLING: Research on Computational Linguistics Conference

== Conferences ==
- IJCNLP-04: The 1st International Joint Conference on Natural Language Processing in Hainan Island, China
- IJCNLP-05: The 2nd International Joint Conference on Natural Language Processing in Jeju Island, Korea
- IJCNLP-08: The 3rd International Joint Conference on Natural Language Processing in Hyderabad, India
- ACL-IJCNLP-2009: Joint Conference of the 47th Annual Meeting of the Association for Computational Linguistics (ACL) and 4th International Joint Conference on Natural Language Processing (IJCNLP) in Singapore
- IJNCLP-11: The 5th International Joint Conference on Natural Language Processing in Chiang Mai, Thailand
