= Semantometrics =

Semantometrics is a tool for evaluating research. It is functionally an extension of tools such as bibliometrics, webometrics, and altmetrics, but instead of just evaluating citations – which entails relying on outside evidence – it uses a semantic evaluation of the full text of the research paper being evaluated.
