= Charles Lynn Wayne =

American program manager

Charles Lynn Wayne (February 10, 1943 – November 23, 2024) was an American program manager at the Defense Advanced Research Projects Agency (DARPA). He was instrumental in creating the Common Task Method for advancing speech recognition and natural language processing technologies by centering around public benchmarks and datasets, and in establishing Human Language Technology (HLT) initiatives programs at DARPA including TIDES (Translingual Information Detection, Extraction, and Summarization) and EARS (Effective, Affordable, Reusable Speech-to-Text).

== Career at DARPA ==
=== Automatic Speech Recognition ===
Wayne joined DARPA in 1988 as a project manager and managed the speech program and the natural language program, which incorporated efforts from the former Strategic Computing natural language program. Under his leadership, the program made significant progress in automatic speech recognition technology, with systems like Sphinx achieving 94% accuracy for speaker-independent thousand-word vocabulary recognition by 1989, and Dragon Dictate demonstrating 30,000-word capacity after adaptation to a specific speaker.

Wayne led efforts to standardize libraries of speech audio for benchmarking speech recognition systems. He organized annual meetings characterized as "bake-offs" where researchers would test their systems against standard speech samples. By 1991, Wayne had established the DARPA Spoken Language program with two major components: large vocabulary speech recognition and spoken language understanding for interactive problem solving.

=== Common Task Method ===
Wayne is credited with creating the Common Task Method (CTM) during his time at DARPA in the late 1980s. The method established a cycle beginning with ambitious technical challenges and quantitative performance targets, followed by data acquisition and annotation, parallel research efforts, and objective evaluations. Workshops were regularly held for researchers to discuss results, share technical approaches to increasing the task performance, and design future directions.

Wayne emphasized the importance of objective performance evaluations, working closely with the National Institute of Standards and Technology (NIST) to administer official performance evaluations for DARPA's Human Language Technology (HLT) research.

His emphasis on standardized evaluation metrics, such as Word Error Rate (WER), and the establishment of large-scale linguistic data resources through the Linguistic Data Consortium, created a technical infrastructure that enabled decades of progress in speech and language technologies. His approach to topic detection and tracking demonstrated "the virtue of formal research task definitions, common data, and common evaluations" in driving technological progress.

=== Linguistic Data Consortium ===
Wayne played a role in establishing the Linguistic Data Consortium (LDC). In 1987, Frederick Jelinek met Jacob Schwartz at DARPA concerning the necessity of large datasets in linguistic AI research. Schwartz informed Wayne, who then invited the appropriate people to a meeting at the Lake Mohunk Mountain, resulting in the LDC. The LDC became responsible for acquiring, annotating, and distributing most of the speech and text data used in DARPA's HLT research and evaluations. This initiative addressed the need for vast quantities of data essential for advancing language technology research.

=== Text Retrieval Conference ===
Wayne was instrumental in the creation of the Text Retrieval Conference (TREC) program. In 1990–1991, he asked Donna Harman at NIST to help create a new, large test collection for the TIPSTER Program. This initiative evolved into TREC, which significantly advanced information retrieval research and technologies.

=== TIDES and EARS Programs ===
During his second term as a project manager at DARPA (2001–2005), Wayne led two significant programs in the Information Awareness Office:

- TIDES (Translingual Information Detection, Extraction, and Summarization) – This program aimed to enable English speakers to find and interpret critical information regardless of language or medium. The project addressed natural language processing needs for discovery tools to find information in foreign languages and convert speech to text.
- EARS (Effective, Affordable, Reusable Speech-to-Text) – This program aimed to produce rich, accurate transcripts of natural human-human speech useful to both people and machines. Wayne set ambitious goals for reducing word error rates in English, Chinese, and Arabic speech recognition.
