= FrameNet =

Group of online lexical databases

- Mission statement: Building a lexical database based on a theory of meaning called frame semantics.
- Commercial?: No (freely available for download)
- Type of project: Lexical database (containing: frames, frame elements(FE), lexical units (LU), examples sentences, and frame relations)
- Location: International Computer Science Institute in Berkeley, California
- Owner: Collin Baker (current project manager)
- Founder: Charles J. Fillmore
- Established: 1997; 29 years ago
- Website: framenet.icsi.berkeley.edu

FrameNet is a group of online lexical databases based upon the theory of meaning known as Frame semantics, developed by linguist Charles J. Fillmore. The project's fundamental notion is simple: most words' meanings may be best understood in terms of a semantic frame, which is a description of a certain kind of event, connection, or item and its actors.

As an illustration, the act of cooking usually requires the following: a cook, the food being cooked, a container to hold the food while it is being cooked, and a heating instrument. Within FrameNet, this act is represented by a frame named Apply_heat, and its components (Cook, Food, Container, and Heating_instrument), are referred to as frame elements (FEs). The Apply_heat frame also lists a number of words that represent it, known as lexical units (LUs), like fry, bake, boil, and broil.

Other frames are simpler. For example, Placing only has an agent or cause, a theme—something that is placed—and the location where it is placed. Some frames are more complex, like Revenge, which contains more FEs (offender, injury, injured party, avenger, and punishment), but groups some of them into sets, where only one FE per set (e.g. injury or injured party) need be present to satisfy semantic requirements. As in the examples of Apply_heat and Revenge below, FrameNet's role is to define the frames and annotate sentences to demonstrate how the FEs fit syntactically around the word that elicits the frame.

== Concepts ==
=== Frames ===
A frame is a schematic representation of a situation involving various participants, props, and other conceptual roles. Examples of frame names are Being_born and Locative_relation. A frame in FrameNet contains a textual description of what it represents (a frame definition), associated frame elements, lexical units, example sentences, and frame-to-frame relations.

=== Frame elements ===
Frame elements (FE) provide additional information to the semantic structure of a sentence. Each frame has a number of core and non-core FEs which can be thought of as semantic roles. Core FEs are essential to the meaning of the frame while non-core FEs are generally descriptive (such as time, place, manner, etc.) For example:

- The only core FE of the Being_born frame is called Child; non-core FEs Time, Place, Means, etc.
- Core FEs of the Commerce_goods-transfer frame include the Seller, Buyer, and Goods, while non-core FEs include a Place, Purpose, etc.

FrameNet includes shallow data on syntactic roles that frame elements play in the example sentences. For example, for a sentence like "She was born about AD 460", FrameNet would mark She as a noun phrase referring to the Child frame element, and "about AD 460" as a noun phrase corresponding to the Time frame element. Details of how frame elements can be realized in a sentence are important because this reveals important information about the subcategorization frames as well as possible diathesis alternations (e.g. "John broke the window" vs. "The window broke") of a verb.

=== Lexical units ===
Lexical units (LUs) are lemmas, with their part of speech, that evoke a specific frame. In other words, when an LU is identified in a sentence, that specific LU can be associated with its specific frame(s). For each frame, there may be many LUs associated to that frame, and also there may be many frames that share a specific LU; this is typically the case with LUs that have multiple word senses. Alongside the frame, each lexical unit is associated with specific frame elements by means of the annotated example sentences.

For example, lexical units that evoke the Complaining frame (or more specific perspectivized versions of it, to be precise), include the verbs complain, grouse, lament, and others.

=== Example sentences ===
Frames are associated with example sentences and frame elements are marked within the sentences. Thus, the sentence

She was born about AD 460

is associated with the frame Being_born, while She is marked as the frame element Child and "about AD 460" is marked as Time.

From the start, the FrameNet project has been committed to looking at evidence from actual language use as found in text collections like the British National Corpus. Based on such example sentences, automatic semantic role labeling tools are able to determine frames and mark frame elements in new sentences.

=== Valences ===
FrameNet also exposes statistics on the valence of each frame; that is, the number and position of the frame elements within example sentences. The sentence

She was born about AD 460

falls in the valence pattern

NP Ext, INI --, NP Dep

which occurs twice in the FrameNet's annotation report for the born.v lexical unit, namely:

She was born about AD 460, daughter and granddaughter of Roman and Byzantine emperors, whose family had been prominent in Roman politics for over 700 years.
He was soon posted to north Africa, and never met their only child, a daughter born 8 June 1941.

=== Frame relations ===
FrameNet additionally captures relationships between different frames using the following relations:

- Inheritance: When one frame is a more specific version of another, more abstract, parent frame. Anything that is true about the parent frame must also be true about the child frame, and a mapping is specified between the frame elements of the parent and the frame elements of the child.
- Perspective on: A neutral frame is connected to a frame with a specific perspective of the same scenario. For example, Commerce_transfer-goods is considered from the perspective of the buyer in Commerce_buy and from that of the seller in Commerce_sell.
- Subframe: Some frames refer to complex scenarios that consist of several individual states or events that can be described by separate frames. For example, Criminal_process is composed of subframes Arrest, Trial, and so on.
- Precedes: This relation captures the temporal order that holds between subframes of a complex frame. For example, within the Cycle_of_life_and_death frame, the subframe Death is preceded by the subframe Being_born.
- Causative and Inchoative: These two relations mark, for causative- and inchoative-aspect frames, the separate stative frame they refer to. For example, the stative Position_on_a_scale (e.g. "She had a high salary") is described by the causative Cause_change_of_scalar_position (e.g. "She raised his salary") and by the inchoative Change_position_on_a_scale frame (e.g. "Her salary increased").
- Using: This relation marks a frame that in some way involves another frame, but does not necessarily have to have all the same frame elements, unlike for inheritance relations. For example, Judgment_communication uses both Judgment and Statement, but does not inherit from either of them because there is no clear correspondence of frame elements.
- Metaphor: When a frame (source) is used metaphorically to evoke another frame's meaning (target). For instance, in "She was not moved by his argument" the source frame Cause_motion evokes the target frame Suasion.
- See also: Connects frames that bear some resemblance but need to be distinguished carefully.

== Applications ==
FrameNet has proven to be useful in a number of computational applications, because computers need additional knowledge in order to recognize that "John sold a car to Mary" and "Mary bought a car from John" describe essentially the same situation, despite using two quite different verbs, different prepositions and a different word order. FrameNet has been used in applications like question answering, paraphrasing, recognizing textual entailment, and information extraction, either directly or by means of Semantic Role Labeling tools. The first automatic system for Semantic Role Labeling (SRL, sometimes also referred to as "shallow semantic parsing") was developed by Daniel Gildea and Daniel Jurafsky based on FrameNet in 2002. Semantic Role Labeling has since become one of the standard tasks in natural language processing, with the latest version (1.7) of FrameNet now fully supported in the Natural Language Toolkit.

Since frames are essentially semantic descriptions, they are similar across languages, and several projects have arisen over the years that have relied on the original FrameNet as the basis for additional non-English FrameNets, for Spanish, Japanese, German, and Polish, among others.

== See also ==
- BabelNet: a multilingual semantic network integrating FrameNet
- PropBank
- WordNet
- Null instantiation
- Frame language
- UBY: a database of 10 resources including FrameNet
