= Computational linguistics =

Use of computational tools for the study and application of linguistics

Computational linguistics is an interdisciplinary field concerned with the computational modelling of natural language, as well as the study of appropriate computational approaches to linguistic questions. In general, computational linguistics draws upon and contributes to linguistics, computer science, artificial intelligence, mathematics, logic, philosophy, cognitive science, cognitive psychology, psycholinguistics, anthropology, and neuroscience, among others. Computational linguistics is closely related to mathematical linguistics.

== Origins ==
The field overlapped with artificial intelligence since the efforts in the United States in the 1950s to use computers to automatically translate texts from foreign languages, particularly Russian scientific journals, into English. Since rule-based approaches were able to make arithmetic (systematic) calculations much faster and more accurately than humans, it was expected that lexicon, morphology, syntax and semantics can be learned using explicit rules, as well. After the failure of rule-based approaches, David Hays coined the term in order to distinguish the field from AI and co-founded both the Association for Computational Linguistics (ACL) and the International Committee on Computational Linguistics (ICCL) in the 1970s and 1980s. What started as an effort to translate between languages evolved into a much wider field of natural language processing.

== Annotated corpora ==
In order to be able to meticulously study the English language, an annotated text corpus was much needed. The Penn Treebank was one of the most used corpora. It consisted of IBM computer manuals, transcribed telephone conversations, and other texts, together containing over 4.5 million words of American English, annotated using both part-of-speech tagging and syntactic bracketing.

Japanese sentence corpora were analyzed and a pattern of log-normality was found in relation to sentence length.

== Computational semantics ==
Computational semantics is a subfield of computational linguistics. Its goal is to elucidate the cognitive mechanisms supporting the generation and interpretation of meaning in humans. It usually involves the creation of computational models that simulate particular semantic phenomena, and the evaluation of those models against data from human participants. While computational semantics is a scientific field, it has many applications in real-world settings and substantially overlaps with Artificial Intelligence.

Broadly speaking, the discipline can be subdivided into areas that mirror the internal organization of linguistics. For example, lexical semantics and frame semantics have active research communities within computational linguistics. Some popular methodologies are also strongly inspired by traditional linguistics. Most prominently, the area of distributional semantics, which underpins investigations into embeddings and the internals of Large Language Models, has roots in the work of Zellig Harris.

Some traditional topics of interest in computational semantics are: construction of meaning representations, semantic underspecification, anaphora resolution, presupposition projection, and quantifier scope resolution. Methods employed usually draw from formal semantics or statistical semantics. Computational semantics has points of contact with the areas of lexical semantics (word-sense disambiguation and semantic role labeling), discourse semantics, knowledge representation and automated reasoning (in particular, automated theorem proving). Since 1999 there has been an ACL special interest group on computational semantics, SIGSEM.

== Modeling language acquisition ==
The fact that during language acquisition, children are largely only exposed to positive evidence, meaning that the only evidence for what is a correct form is provided, and no evidence for what is not correct, was a limitation for the models at the time because the now available deep learning models were not available in late 1980s.

It has been shown that languages can be learned with a combination of simple input presented incrementally as the child develops better memory and longer attention span, which explained the long period of language acquisition in human infants and children.

Robots have been used to test linguistic theories. Enabled to learn as children might, models were created based on an affordance model in which mappings between actions, perceptions, and effects were created and linked to spoken words. Crucially, these robots were able to acquire functioning word-to-meaning mappings without needing grammatical structure.

Using the Price equation and Pólya urn dynamics, researchers have created a system which not only predicts future linguistic evolution but also gives insight into the evolutionary history of modern-day languages.

=== Computational models ===
Computational models have long been used to explore the mechanisms by which language learners process and manipulate linguistic information. Models of this type allow researchers to systematically control important learning variables that are oftentimes difficult to manipulate at all in human participants.

== Chomsky's theories ==
Noam Chomsky's theories have influenced computational linguistics, particularly in understanding how infants learn complex grammatical structures, such as those described in Chomsky normal form. Attempts have been made to determine how an infant learns a "non-normal grammar" as theorized by Chomsky normal form. Research in this area combines structural approaches with computational models to analyze large linguistic corpora like the Penn Treebank, helping to uncover patterns in language acquisition.

== Software ==
- spaCy
- WordNet
- NooJ
- Foma (software)
- Grammatical Framework
- GloVe

== See also ==
- Artificial intelligence in fiction
- Collostructional analysis
- Computational lexicology
- Computational Linguistics (journal)
- Computational semiotics
- Computer-assisted reviewing
- Dialog systems
- Glottochronology
- Grammar induction
- Human speechome project
- Internet linguistics
- Lexicostatistics
- Natural language processing
- Natural language user interface
- Quantitative linguistics
- Semantic relatedness
- Semantometrics
- Systemic functional linguistics
- Translation memory
- Universal Networking Language
