= International Computer Science Institute =

US research laboratory

Coordinates: 37.870052°N 122.271235°W

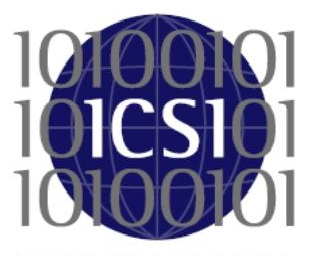
- Established: 1988
- Focus: Computer science
- President: Dr. Lea Shanley
- Location: Berkeley, California, United States

The International Computer Science Institute (ICSI) is an independent, non-profit research organization located in Berkeley, California, United States. Since its founding in 1988, ICSI has maintained an affiliation agreement with the University of California, Berkeley, where several of its members hold faculty appointments.

== Research areas ==
ICSI's research activities include Internet architecture, network security, network routing, speech and speaker recognition, spoken and text-based natural language processing, computer vision, multimedia, privacy and biological system modeling.

== Research groups and leaders ==
- The Institute's director is Dr. Lea Shanley.
- SIGCOMM Award winner Professor Scott Shenker, one of the most-cited authors in computer science, is the Chief Scientist and head of the New Initiatives group.
- SIGCOMM Award winner Professor Vern Paxson, who leads network security efforts and who previously chaired the Internet Research Task Force.
- Professor Jerry Feldman is the head of the Artificial Intelligence Group.
- Adjunct Professor Gerald Friedland is the head of the Audio and Multimedia Group.
- Dr. Stella Yu is head of the Computer Vision Group.
- Dr. Serge Egelman is head of the Usable Security and Privacy Group.
- Dr. Steven Wegman is head of the Speech Group.

== Notable members and alumni ==
- Turing Award and Kyoto Prize winner Professor Richard Karp is an alumnus and former head of the Algorithms Group.
- Professor Nelson Morgan is a former director and former head of the speech group.
- Professor Trevor Darrell is an alumnus and former head of the Computer Vision Group.
- Professor Krste Asanovic, an ACM Distinguished Scientist, is an alumna and former head of the Computer Architecture Group.
- IEEE Internet Award winner Sally Floyd; connectionist pioneer Jerry Feldman; frame semantics and construction grammar pioneer Charles J. Fillmore and Collin F. Baker, who lead the FrameNet semantic parsing project; and Paul Kay, who published an influential study on the universality of color words.
- IEEE Internet Award winner Mark Handley founded the XORP open source router software project while at ICSI.
