= Charles J. Fillmore =

American linguist (1929–2014)

- Fillmore in 2012
- Born: August 9, 1929; St. Paul, Minnesota, US
- Died: February 13, 2014 (aged 84); San Francisco, California, US
- Spouse: Lily Wong Fillmore
- Awards: 2012 Lifetime Achievement Award from the Association for Computational Linguistics

Academic background
- Education: University of Minnesota (B.A, Linguistics); University of Michigan (Ph.D., 1961)

Academic work
- Discipline: Linguist
- Institutions: Ohio State University
- Notable students: Laura Michaelis, Len Talmy, Eve Sweetser, Miriam R. L. Petruck
- Main interests: Cognitive linguistics, case grammar, frame semantics, FrameNet
- Website: linguistics.berkeley.edu/people/fac/fillmore.html

Charles J. Fillmore (August 9, 1929 – February 13, 2014) was an American linguist and Professor of Linguistics at the University of California, Berkeley. He received his Ph.D. in Linguistics from the University of Michigan in 1961. Fillmore spent ten years at Ohio State University and a year as a Fellow at the Center for Advanced Study in the Behavioral Sciences at Stanford University before joining Berkeley's Department of Linguistics in 1971. Fillmore was influential in the areas of syntax and lexical semantics.

A three-day conference was held at UC Berkeley in celebration of his 80th birthday in 2009. Fillmore received the 2012 Lifetime Achievement Award of the Association for Computational Linguistics. He died in 2014.

== Early years ==
Fillmore spent three years in the U.S. Army stationed in Japan, where he intercepted coded Russian conversations on short-wave radio and taught himself Japanese. Following his discharge, he taught English at a Buddhist girls' school while also taking classes at Kyoto University.

He returned to the US, receiving his doctorate at the University of Michigan and then teaching at The Ohio State University in Columbus. At the time, he was still a proponent of Noam Chomsky's theory of generative grammar during its earliest transformational grammar phase. In 1963, his seminal article The position of embedding transformations in a Grammar introduced the transformational cycle. The central idea is to first apply rules to the smallest applicable unit, then to the smallest unit containing that one, and so on. This principle has been a foundational insight for theories of syntax since that time.

== Cognitive linguistics ==
By 1965, Fillmore had come to acknowledge that semantics plays a crucial role in grammar.

In 1968, he published his theory of Case Grammar (Fillmore 1968), which highlighted the fact that syntactic structure can be predicted by semantic participants. An action can have an agent, a patient, purposes, locations, and so on. These participants were called "cases" in his original paper, but later came to be known as semantic roles or thematic relations, which are similar to theta roles in generative grammar.

Following his move to the University of California, Berkeley, in 1971, this theory eventually evolved into a broader cognitive linguistic theory called Frame Semantics (1976). A commercial transaction, for instance, crucially involves elements such as a seller, a buyer, some good, and some money. In language, such an event can be expressed in a variety of different ways, e.g. using the verb 'to sell' or the verb 'to buy'. According to frame semantics, meaning is best studied in terms of the mental concepts and participants in the minds of the speaker and addressee.

Around the same time, Fillmore's Santa Cruz Lectures on Deixis, delivered in 1971 and published in 1975, contributed to establishing the field of linguistic pragmatics, which studies the relationship between linguistic form and the context of utterance.

In all of this research, he illuminated the fundamental importance of semantics, and its role in motivating syntactic and morphological phenomena. His collaboration with Paul Kay and George Lakoff was generalized into the theory of Construction Grammar. This work aimed at developing a complete theory of grammar that would fully acknowledge the role of semantics right from the start, breaking with the dominant form-based approaches, while simultaneously adopting constraint-based formalisms as popular in computer science and natural language processing. This theory is built on the notion of construction from traditional and pedagogical grammars rather than the rule-based formalisms that dominate most of generative grammar. One of Fillmore's most widely noticed works of the time (with Paul Kay and Cathy O'Connor) appeared in Language in 1988 as "Regularity and Idiomaticity in Grammatical Constructions: The Case of Let Alone". Their paper highlighted the merits of such a theory of by focusing on the 'let alone' construction. Over time, construction grammar developed into a research area of its own, and a number of variants have been proposed over the years by different researchers.

Fillmore is now widely recognized as one of the founders of cognitive linguistics. The first chapter of Cognitive Linguistics by Cruse and Croft (2004), for instance, begins with a summary of Fillmore's work. Fillmore served as president of the Linguistic Society of America in 1991 and was awarded an honorary doctorate from the University of Chicago in 2000.

His legacy continues with his many notable students, including Adele Goldberg, Laura Michaelis, Christopher Johnson, Miriam R. L. Petruck, Len Talmy, and Eve Sweetser, Barbara Dancygier and others.

== FrameNet ==
In 1988, Fillmore taught classes in computational lexicography at a summer school at the University of Pisa, where he met Sue Atkins, who was conducting frame-semantic analyses from a lexicographic perspective. In their subsequent discussions and collaborations, Fillmore came to acknowledge the importance of considering corpus data. They discussed the "dictionary of the future", in which every word would be linked to example sentences from corpora.

After 23 years at the University of California, Berkeley, Fillmore retired in 1994 and joined Berkeley's International Computer Science Institute. There, he started a project called FrameNet, an on-line structured description of the English lexicon implementing much of what he had earlier proposed more theoretically in his theory of Frame semantics, while implementing the idea of emphasizing example sentences from corpora. In FrameNet, words are described in terms of the frames they evoke. Data is gathered from the British National Corpus, annotated for semantic and syntactic relations, and stored in a database organized by both lexical units and Frames.

FrameNet has inspired parallel projects, which investigate other languages, including Spanish, German, and Japanese. I

== Publications ==
His seminal publications include:

- "The Position of Embedding Transformations in a Grammar" (1963). In Word 19:208-231.
- "The grammar of HITTING and BREAKING" (1967), Working Papers in Linguistics, Ohio State University 1: 9—29
- "The Case for Case" (1968). In Bach and Harms (Ed.): Universals in Linguistic Theory. New York: Holt, Rinehart, and Winston, 1-88.
- "Frame semantics and the nature of language" (1976): . In Annals of the New York Academy of Sciences: Conference on the Origin and Development of Language and Speech. Volume 280: 20-32.
- "Frame semantics" (1982). In Linguistics in the Morning Calm. Seoul, Hanshin Publishing Co., 111-137.
- (with Paul Kay and Mary Catherine O'Connor) "Regularity and Idiomaticity in Grammatical Constructions: The Case of Let Alone" (1988). Language. Vol. 64, No. 3 (Sep., 1988), 501-538
- (with Sue Atkins) "Starting where the dictionaries stop: The challenge for computational lexicography". (1994). In Atkins, B. T. S. and A. Zampolli (Eds.) Computational Approaches to the Lexicon. Oxford: Oxford University Press, 349-393.
- (with Paul Kay) "Construction Grammar" (1995). Stanford: CSLI
- Lectures on Deixis (1997). Stanford: CSLI Publications. (originally distributed as Fillmore (1975/1971) Santa Cruz Lectures on Deixis by the Indiana University Linguistics Club)

== Personal life ==
Fillmore was married to Lily Wong Fillmore, a linguist and professor emeritus at Berkeley.

Preceded by Eugene Charniak	ACL Lifetime Achievement Award; 2012	Succeeded by Jerry R. Hobbs
