= Universal Conceptual Cognitive Annotation =

Semantic annotation framework for natural language text

Universal Conceptual Cognitive Annotation (UCCA) is a semantic approach to grammatical representation. It is a cross-linguistically applicable semantic representation scheme, and has demonstrated support for rapid annotation.
