= Linguistic Data Consortium =

- Founded: 1992; 34 years ago
- Headquarters: Philadelphia, Pennsylvania, United States
- Website: www.ldc.upenn.edu

The Linguistic Data Consortium is an open consortium of universities, companies and government research laboratories. It creates, collects and distributes speech and text databases, lexicons, and other resources for linguistics research and development purposes. The University of Pennsylvania is the LDC's host institution. The LDC was founded in 1992 with a grant from the US Defense Advanced Research Projects Agency (DARPA), and is partly supported by grant IRI-9528587 from the Information and Intelligent Systems division of the National Science Foundation. The director of LDC is Mark Liberman. It subsumed the previous ACL Data Collection Initiative.

Part of the motivation was to support the benchmark-oriented methodology of DARPA's Human Language Technology program. Previously, John R. Pierce directed the committee that produced the ALPAC report (1966), which caused a severe decrease in funding for linguistic AI for about 10 years. Later, Charles Wayne restarted funding in speech and language in the mid-1980s. In order to avoid the criticisms from the ALPAC report, they needed a way to demonstrate objective progress, which led to the benchmark-oriented methodology. DARPA would propose specific quantifiable and testable score targets on benchmarks, and teams being funded would attempt to reach the score targets.

It was noted that by 1993, the data needed for training and benchmarking the models was big enough that "Not even the largest companies can easily afford enough of [the needed] data... Researchers at smaller companies and in universities risk being frozen out of the process almost entirely." The LDC provided a central location for creating and dispensing such data. There is a membership fee that has been increased once since its founding.

== See also ==
- Corpus linguistics
- Cross-Linguistic Linked Data (CLLD) – project coordinating over a dozen linguistics databases; hosted by the Max Planck Institute (Germany)
- Machine translation
- Natural language processing
- Speech technology
- ACL Data Collection Initiative
- Charles Lynn Wayne
