= Comparison of computer-assisted translation tools =

A number of computer-assisted translation software and websites exists for various platforms and access types. According to a 2006 survey undertaken by Imperial College of 874 translation professionals from 54 countries, primary tool usage was reported as follows: Trados (35%), Wordfast (17%), Déjà Vu (16%), SDL Trados 2006 (15%), SDLX (4%), STAR Transit (3%), OmegaT (3%), others (7%).

The list below includes only some of the existing available software and website platforms.

Name	Supported File Formats	OS	Language	Widget tool	License
Across Language Server	Microsoft Word (DOC, DOT, DOCX, and DOCM files), Microsoft Excel (XLS files, and XLSX and XLSM files), Microsoft PowerPoint (PPT and PPS files as well as PPTX, PPSX, and PPTM files), Rich Text Format1 (RTF files), text files (TXT files), TeX (TEX files), HTML, XHTML, XML, SGML, Adobe FrameMaker (in MIF format), Adobe InDesign (IDML files, in INX exchange format) Adobe InCopy (INCX format), BroadVision QuickSilver (ILDOC files), QuarkXPress (export to XTG format, re-import upon translation), Executable files (EXE files); Dynamic Link Library (DLL files), Resource Script files (RC, RC2, and DLL files), .NET RESX files (RESX files), .NET RESOURCE files (RESOURCE files), .NET Satellite Assemblies (RESOURCE.DLL files), Windows Installer (MSI files), configuration files (INI files), OLE Control, extensions (OCX files), Screen Saver (SCR files), Control Panel Extensions (CPL files), National Language Support (NLS files), Portable Object (PO files), MC files (Message Compiler), PROPERTIES files (Java Property), Android: (string XML files with HTML markup), iOS (text-based strings files (UTF-8 or UTF-16)), BlackBerry (ANSI-based text files in rrc format), XML Localization Interchange (XLIFF or XLF), Drawing Interchange Format (DXF files)	Windows			Proprietary
Crowdin	xliff, xml, resx, properties, plist, xlf, arb, csv, ini, json, xml, po, pot, json, ini, ts, yml, vdf, rc, resw, resjson, dtd, strings, html, xhtml, xht, docx, xlsx, pptx, odt, ods, odg, odp, txt, mif, idml, haml, md, html, flsnp, flpgl, fltoc, md, wiki, wikitext, mediawiki, srt, vtt, xaml, sbv, tmx, tbx	web-based			Proprietary
Déjà Vu	Microsoft Office (Word, Excel, Powerpoint, also embedded objects, and Access), Help Contents (CNT), FrameMaker (MIF), PageMaker, QuarkXPress, QuickSilver/Interleaf ASCII, Java Properties (.properties), HTML, HTML Help, XML, RC, C/Java/C++, IBM TM/2, Trados Workbench, Trados BIF (old TagEditor), Trados TagEditor, JavaScript, VBScript, ODBC, TMX, EBU, InDesign (TXT, ITD, INX, IDML), GNU GetText (PO/POT), OpenOffice, OpenDocument SDLX (ITD), ResX, XLIFF (XLF, XLIF, XLIFF, MQXLIFF, unsegmented and segmented SDLXLIFF), Visio (VDX), PDF, Transit NXT PPF, WordFast Pro TXML	Windows			Proprietary
GlobalSight	Text ANSI / ASCII / Unicode for Windows, Text for Apple Macintosh, HTML, XML (ASP.NET, ASP, JSP, XSL), SGML, MS Word for Windows, MS Excel, MS PowerPoint, RTF, RC, Adobe FrameMaker, Adobe InDesign	Java platform / Java			Apache License 2.0
gtranslator	PO	POSIX	C	GTK+	GNU General Public License
MateCat	doc, dot, docx, dotx, docm, dotm, pdf, xls, xlt, xlsm, xlsx, xltx, pot, pps, ppt, potm, potx, ppsm, ppsx, pptm, pptx, odp, ods, odt, sxw, sxc, sxl, txt, csv, xml, rtf, htm, html, xhtml, xml, xliff, sdlxliff, tmx, ttx, itd, xlf, mif, inx, idml, icml, xtg, tag, xml, dita, properties, rc, resx, sgml, sgm	web based (supports Safari and Chrome)	PHP		GNU Lesser General Public License
memoQ	.MIF, InDesign formats (.INDD, .INX, .IDML), .XML, .DITA, .XML, .MM, .PO, .HTML, .HMT, .SHT, .properties, .DOC, .RTF, .BAK, .DOT, .DOCX, .XLS, .XML, .XLSX, .XLSM, .XLS, .XLT, .PPT, .PPS, .POT, .PPF, .PPTX, .PPSX, .POTX, .SLDX, .VDX, .HHC, .HHK, .ODT, .ODF, .TXT, .INF, .INI, .REG, .PDF, .SVG, .SDLPPX, .TTX, .SDLXLIFF, .TMX, .TXML, .RESX, .XLF, .XLIF, .XLIFF, XLIFF:doc	Windows			Proprietary
MetaTexis	Microsoft Word, Excel and Powerpoint, all kinds of text formats, XML, HTML, XLIFF, RTF, TRADOS Studio (SDLXLIFF), TagEditor (TTX), POT/PO, Manual Maker, several further formats...	Microsoft Office Word add-in			Proprietary
OmegaT	Plain text, HTML, XHTML, StarOffice, OpenOffice.org, OpenDocument (ODF), MS Office Open XML, Help & Manual, HTML Help Compiler (HCC), LaTeX, DokuWiki, QuarkXPress CopyFlow Gold, DocBook, Android Resource, Java Properties, Typo3 LocManager, Mozilla DTD, Windows RC, WiX, ResX, INI files, XLIFF, PO, SubRip Subtitles, SVG Images	Java platform / Java			GNU General Public License
Open Language Tools	XLIFF, HTML/XHTML, XML, DocBook SGML, ASCII, StarOffice/OpenOffice/ODF, PO, .properties, .java (ResourceBundle), .msg/.tmsg (catgets)	Java platform / Java			CDDL
Phrase	Android XML, Angular Translate JSON, Chrome JSON Messages, CSV, .NET ResX, Episerver XML, Excel XLSX, Gettext compiled Mo-Files, Gettext PO-Files, Gettext Template POT-Files, go-i18n JSON, i18n-node-2 JSON, i18next, INI, iOS Localizable Strings Resources, iOS Localizable Stringsdict for pluralized translation keys, Java Properties XML, Java Properties, Mozilla Properties, Nested JSON, Objective-C/Cocoa Property List, PHP Array, Laravel/F3/Kohana Array, Play Framework Properties, Qt Phrase Book, Qt Translation Source, React-Intl Simple JSON, React-Intl Nested JSON, Ruby on Rails YAML, EmberJS (Nested JSON), Simple JSON, Symfony XLIFF, Symfony YAML, Symfony 2 YAML, Translation Memory eXchange TMX, Windows 8 Resource, Windows Phone ResX, XLIFF, Zendesk CSV for Dynamic Content	web-based			Proprietary
Poedit	PO, XLIFF	Cross-platform	C++	GTK+	MIT License
Pootle	PO, XLIFF, OpenOffice GSI files (.sdf), TMX, TBX, Java Properties, DTD, CSV, HTML, XHTML, Plain Text, Qt.ts, Java .properties files, PHP array files, Mac OS X strings	Cross-platform	Python	Web	GNU General Public License
SDL Trados Studio	Features four translation environments: dedicated TagEditor, MSWord Interface, SDLX, the integrated interface SDL Trados Studio 2014. Filters for translating with Trados Studio or TagEditor available: Word, Excel, PowerPoint, OpenOffice, InDesign, QuarkXPress, PageMaker, Interleaf, Framemaker, HTML, SGML, XML, SVG, Xliff, Legacy Trados files TTX, ITD, Word Bilingual, Wordfast, MemoQ .... Includes SDL MultiTerm for terminology management and Project Management Dashboard for automating tasks and tracking.	Windows			Proprietary
SmartCAT	Text documents: DOCX, DOC, TXT, RTF. PowerPoint presentations: PPTX, PPSX, PPT, PPS. Excel spreadsheets: XLSX, XLS. Scanned documents and images: PDF, JPG, TIFF, BMP, PNG, GIF, DJVU and more. HTML pages: HTML, HTM. OpenOffice files: ODP, ODS. Resource files: RESX. Bilingual files: TTX. Industry-standard formats: SDLXLIFF, XLF, XLIFF, TMX. HTML pages: HTML, HTM. InDesign CS4 Markup: IDML.	Cross-platform	C#	Web	Proprietary
UNMIN Machine Assisted Translation system (discontinued)	Plain Text (ANSI / ASCII / Unicode), Rich Text, HTML, MS Word (.doc)	Web	PHP		Limited to UN operations in Nepal
Virtaal	XLIFF, PO and MO, TMX, TBX, Wordfast TM, Qt ts Many others via converters in the Translate Toolkit	Cross-platform	Python	GTK+	GNU General Public License
Wordfast	MS Word, Excel, PowerPoint (all versions), PDF, SGML, HTML, XML, InDesign, FrameMaker, tagged documents, XLIFF, etc.	Java platform / Java, Microsoft Office add-in			Proprietary

== See also ==
- Machine translation
- Comparison of machine translation applications
- Translation management systems
