= Smartcat =

Cloud-based translation platform

- Website type: Computer-assisted translation, globalization management system, freelance marketplace, payment automation platform, legal automation platform
- Website: www.smartcat.com
- Launched: July 2015; 11 years ago

Smartcat is a cloud-based translation and localization platform that connects businesses, translators, and translation agencies in a single Connected Translation delivery loop. The platform positions itself as an "all-in-one" translation platform, combining CAT, TMS, and other translation technologies.

== History ==
Smartcat was originally developed as a CAT tool in 2012–2015 as an in-house solution by ABBYY Language Solutions (ABBYY LS), a linguistic service provider within the ABBYY group of companies. The impetus for its development was that ABBYY LS had "felt constrained by translation technologies that had existed for the last 15 years" and wanted an "intuitive, cloud-based, scalable, and powerful" solution that would let them manage projects with dozens of collaborators, including project managers, translators, editors, and other professionals.”

In 2016, Smartcat spun out of ABBYY LS to become a separate company and attracted $2.8 million in investments from Ilya Shirokov (ex-CEO at Odnoklassniki and founder of Yandex-acquired social network MoiKrug.ru). ABBYY LS’s founder and CEO Ivan Smolnikov also left the company to fully focus on Smartcat. The main reasons for the separation were that the "translation automation business turned out to be far from complementary to the services of language services providers" and that “some translation companies had been wary of using a service developed by a competitor.”

As of September 2020, the platform has more than 350,000 freelancers in its marketplace and provides an “app store” that allows users to integrate their Smartcat account with third-party tools.

Although Smartcat has an in-built CAT tool that helps translators work faster and more efficiently, its reach and functionality are much broader than that of a CAT tool. It is an all-in-one translation platform connecting businesses and translation professionals while offering additional services like payment automation, a combination the company brands as “Connected Translation”. For example, it allows translation agencies and LSPs to manage their businesses, including everything from searching for new vendors to managing international teams and centralizing international payments.

== Monetization and subscription plans ==
Unlike most industry tools, Smartcat does not charge for user-based licenses, because it believes that counting seats just doesn’t fit in the translation business, where more than 90% of users in companies are freelancers and a varying number of them collaborate on projects on a daily basis.”

Instead, Smartcat’s monetization is primarily based on a percentage-based service fee on top of vendors’ own rates. Smartcat also offers paid subscriptions with some additional features, as well as vendor management and localization engineering support.

== Connected Translation ==
Since early 2019, Smartcat has been using the term Connected Translation to refer to a connected localization ecosystem where businesses, agencies, and translators are combinedinto one content delivery loop. The connected translation model is made up of five key concepts: connectivity, translation, scalability, management, and automated payments:

- Connectivity: interconnecting the content production and translation environments,
- Translation: actually executing the translation job,
- Scalability: sourcing new translation vendors if and when the need arises,
- Management: having control over the process by tracking progress, reassigning vendors, etc.
- Automated payments: sending bulk payments via a single invoice to any number of vendors in any location.

== Document formats ==
Smartcat’s built-in CAT editor supports 70+ input formats, including text documents, presentations, spreadsheets, scanned documents and images (including a paid OCR service), HTML pages, resource files, industry-standard bilingual formats, and others. The platform also supports SDL Trados packages, which allows users to work on projects originally intended for SDL Trados, including generation of return packages to be further handled in Trados.

== #LocFromHome ==
Smartcat is the organizer of the #LocFromHome online language industry conference. The conference is mostly focused on translation buyers and agencies and deals with up-and-coming challenges of the language industry. As of September 2020, there has been two runs of the event, each attracting around 2000 live attendees and featuring around 30 speakers.
