= MemoQ =

Translation management system

memoQ
- Developer: memoQ Translation Technologies
- Stable release: 12.3 / April 2026; 3 months ago
- Operating system: Windows
- Type: Computer-assisted translation
- License: Proprietary
- Website: https://www.memoq.com/

memoQ is a translation management system (TMS) and translation technology platform that runs on Microsoft Windows operating systems. It is developed by the Hungarian software company memoQ Fordítástechnológiai Zrt. (memoQ Translation Technologies), formerly Kilgray, a provider of translation management software established in 2004 and cited as one of the fastest-growing companies in the translation technology sector in 2012, and 2013. memoQ provides translation memory, terminology management, machine translation and AI-assisted translation integration, workflow automation, and collaborative localization features in desktop, client/server and web-based environments.

== History ==
memoQ, a translation environment tool first released in 2006, was the first product created by memoQ Translation Technologies, a company founded in Hungary by the three language technologists Balázs Kis, István Lengyel and Gábor Ugray. In the years since the software was first presented, it has grown in popularity and is now among the most frequent TEnT applications used for translation (it was rated as the third most used CAT tool in a Proz.com study in 2013 and as the second most widely used tool in a June 2010 survey of 458 working translators), after SDL Trados, Wordfast, Déjà Vu, OmegaT and others. Today it is available in desktop versions for translators (Translator Pro edition), and project managers (Project Manager edition), as well as site-installed and hosted server applications offering integration with the desktop versions and a web browser interface. There are currently several active online forums in which users provide each other with independent advice and support on the software's functions, as well as many online tutorials created by professional trainers and active users. Before its commercial debut, a version of memoQ (2.0) was distributed as postcardware.
