= OmegaT =

Computer assisted translation tool written in Java

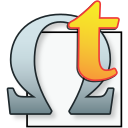

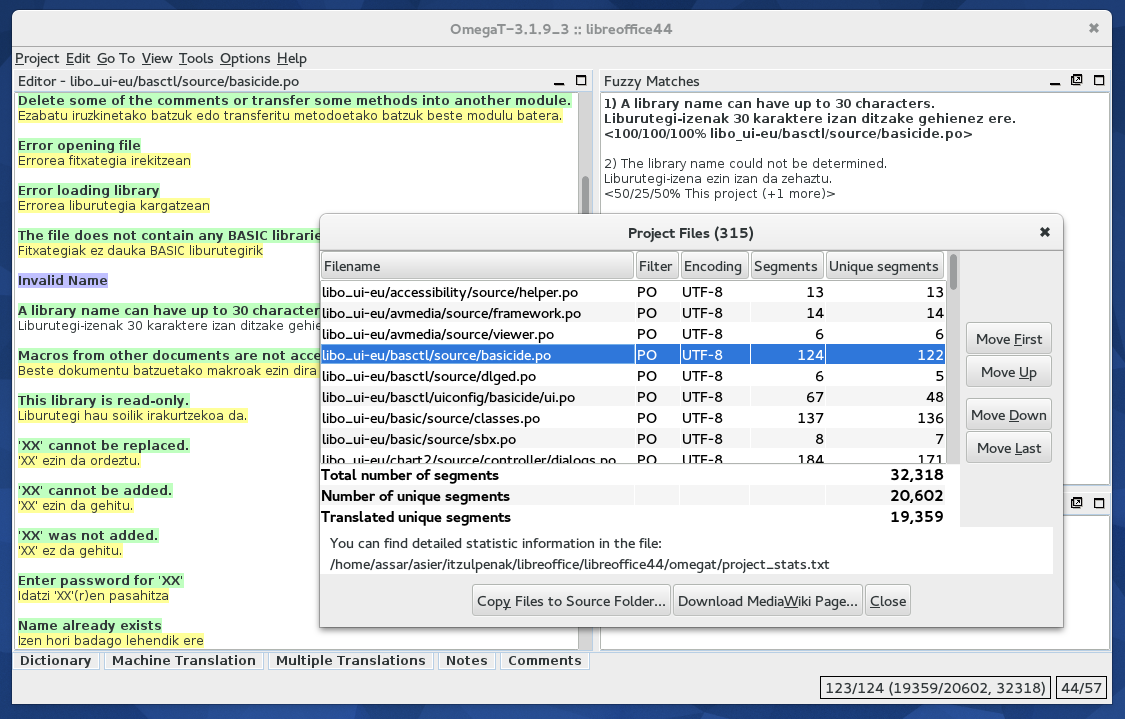
- OmegaT 3.1.9 translating LibreOffice from English to Basque, "Project Files" window
- Original author: Keith Godfrey
- Developers: Aaron Madlon-Kay, Didier Briel, Alex Buloichik, Zoltan Bartko, Tiago Saboga, etc.
- Release: November 28, 2002
- Stable release: 6.0.1 (September 2, 2024; 2 years ago) [±]
- Preview release: 5.7.1 (March 18, 2022; 4 years ago) [±]
- Operating system: Microsoft Windows, macOS, Linux, Solaris
- Type: Computer-assisted translation
- License: GPLv3+
- Website: omegat.org
- Repository: github.com/omegat-org/omegat

OmegaT is a computer-assisted translation tool written in the Java programming language. It is a free, open-source software originally developed by Keith Godfrey in 2000, and is currently developed by a team led by Aaron Madlon-Kay.

OmegaT is intended for professional translators. Its features include customisable segmentation using regular expressions, translation memory with fuzzy matching and match propagation, glossary matching, dictionary matching, translation memory and reference material searching, and inline spell-checking using Hunspell spelling dictionaries.

OmegaT runs on Linux, macOS, Microsoft Windows and Solaris, and requires Java 8. It is available in 27 languages. According to a survey in 2010 among 458 professional translators, OmegaT is used 1/3 as much as Wordfast, Déjà Vu and MemoQ, and 1/8 as much as the market leader Trados.

== History ==
OmegaT was first developed by Keith Godfrey in 2000. It was originally written in C++.

The first public release in February 2001 was written in Java. This version used a proprietary translation memory format. It could translate unformatted text files, and HTML, and perform only block-level segmentation (i.e. paragraphs instead of sentences).

== Development and software releases ==
The development of OmegaT is hosted on SourceForge and led by Aaron Madlon-Kay. There is a "standard" version, which always has a complete user manual and a "latest" version which includes features that are not yet documented in the user manual.

== How OmegaT works ==
OmegaT handles a translation job as a project, a hierarchy of folders with specific names. The user copies non-translated documents into one named /source/ (or subfolders thereof). The Editor pane displays the source documents as individual “segments” for translation one segment at a time. OmegaT, when directed, generates the (partially) translated versions in the /target/ subfolder.

Other named folders include ones for automatic consultation within the program: /tm/ for existing translation pairs in .tmx format, /tm/auto/ for automatic translation of 100% matches, /glossary/ for glossaries, /dictionary/ for StarDict (and .tbx) dictionaries.

When the user goes to translate a segment in the Editor pane, OmegaT automatically searches the .tmx files in the /tm/ hierarchy for previous translation pairs with similar source sentences and displays them in the Fuzzy Matches pane for insertion into the Editor pane with a keyboard shortcut. The Glossary and Dictionary panes provide similar automatic look-up functions for any glossaries and dictionaries in the corresponding named folders in the project. The optional Machine Translation pane shows machine translations from Google Translate and similar services.

When the user leaves a segment, OmegaT normally first adds the source-target pair to its database in memory. It subsequently saves that database to disk in Translation Memory eXchange (.tmx) format for use another day, in other projects, by other translators, and even with other CAT tools. No change, naturally enough, means no such update. Version 3.1 added a setting for blocking targets equal to their sources, a common slip, plus a keyboard shortcut for overriding it—numbers, source code in programming manuals, etc.

At any point, the user can create partially translated versions of the source files. Note that OmegaT copies source segments verbatim if they have yet to be translated. Before doing so, however, the user is advised to use the Validate menu command to check for tag and other errors. Version 3.1 added a menu command (and keyboard shortcut) for limiting operation to the current file—for partial delivery or quick update, for example.

== Features of OmegaT ==
OmegaT shares many features with proprietary CAT tools. These include creating, importing and exporting translation memories, fuzzy matching from translation memories, glossary look-up, and reference and concordance searching.

OmegaT also has additional features that are not always available in other CAT tools. These include:

- OmegaT can translate multiple files in multiple file formats in multiple subfolders simultaneously, and consult multiple translation memories, glossaries and dictionaries (limited only by available computer memory).
- With regard to supported file types, OmegaT allows the user to customise file extensions and file encodings. For a number of document types, the user can choose selectively which elements must be translated (e.g. in OpenOffice.org Writer files, choose whether to include bookmarks; in Microsoft Office 2007/2010 files, choose whether to translate footnotes; or in HTML, choose whether to translate ALT text for images). The user can also choose how non-standard elements in third-party translation memories should be handled.
- OmegaT's segmentation rules are based on regular expressions. Segmentation can be configured based on language or based on file format, and successive segmentation rules inherit values from each other.
- In the edit window, the user can jump directly to the next untranslated segment, or go forward or backwards in history. Users can use undo and redo, copy and paste, and switch between uppercase and lowercase in the same way as one would in an advanced text editor. The user can choose to see the source text of segments that have already been translated. The edit pane also has inline spell-checking using Hunspell dictionaries, and interactive spell-checking is done using the mouse.
- Users can insert fuzzy matches using a keyboard shortcut or using the mouse. OmegaT shows the degree of similarity in fuzzy matches using colours. OmegaT can also display the date, time and the name of the user who translated any given segment. Glossary matches can be inserted using the mouse. The user can choose to have the source text copied into the target text field, or to have the highest fuzzy match automatically inserted.
- In the search window, the user can choose to search the current files' source text, target text, other translation memories, and reference files. Searches can be case sensitive, and regular expressions can also be used. Double-clicking a search result takes the user directly to that segment in the edit window.
- After translation, OmegaT can perform tag validation to ensure that there are no accidental tag errors. OmegaT can calculate statistics for the project files and translation memories before the project starts, or during the translation to show the progress of the translation job.
- OmegaT can get machine translations from Apertium, Belazar, Deepl and Google Translate, and display it in a separate window.
- The various windows in OmegaT's user interface can be moved around, maximised, tiled, tabbed and minimised.

=== Directly supported formats ===
File format	File extension pattern	Format type
Plain text (any text format which Java can handle) encoded in a variety of encodings including Unicode	.txt, .txt1, .txt2, .utf8	Documentation
HTML/XHTML	.html, .htm, .xhtml, .xht	Documentation
OpenDocument (ODF), used in LibreOffice, StarOffice, Apache OpenOffice	.sx?, .st?, .od?, .ot?	Documentation
Microsoft Office Open XML (used in Microsoft Office 2007 and later)	.docx, .xlsx, .pptx	Documentation
Help & Manual	.xml, .hmxp	Documentation
HTML Help Compiler	.hhc, .hhk	Documentation
LaTeX	.tex, .latex	Documentation
DokuWiki	.txt	Documentation
QuarkXPress CopyFlow Gold	.tag, .xtg	Documentation
DocBook	.xml, .dbk	Documentation
Android resources	.xml	Localization
Java properties	.properties	Localization
TYPO3 Localization Manager (l10nmgr)	.xml	Localization
Mozilla DTD	.dtd	Localization
Windows resources	.rc	Localization
WiX localization	.wxl	Localization
ResX	.resx	Localization
Key=Value files	.ini, .lng	Localization
XLIFF	.xlf, .sdlxliff	Multilingual
Portable Object (PO)	.po, .pot	Multilingual
SubRip subtitles	.srt	Other
SVG images	.svg	Other

=== Indirectly supported formats ===
There are two processes that allow OmegaT to handle unsupported formats:

- register the format file extension into the preferred file filter (typically all plain text based formats)
- convert the format to a directly supported format

==== Support for XLIFF ====
The program Rainbow from the Okapi Framework can convert certain file formats to an XLIFF format that OmegaT does support. Rainbow can also create complete OmegaT project folders from such documents, for easier handling in OmegaT.

==== Support for Gettext PO ====
A number of file formats can be converted to Gettext Portable Object (PO) files, which can be translated in OmegaT. The Debian program po4a can convert formats such as LaTeX, TeX and POD to Gettext PO. The Translate Toolkit can convert Mozilla .properties and dtd files, CSV files, certain Qt .ts files, and certain XLIFF files to Gettext PO.

==== Support for Office Open XML and ODF ====
Microsoft Word, Excel and PowerPoint documents from version 97 to 2003 can be converted to Office Open XML (Microsoft Office 2007/2010) or ODF (OpenOffice.org) format. Conversion is not entirely lossless and may lead to loss of formatting.

==== Support for Trados.ttx files ====
Trados.ttx files can be treated using the Okapi TTX Filter.

== Supported memory and glossary formats ==
=== Translation memories in TMX format ===
OmegaT's internal translation memory format is not visible to the user, but every time it autosaves the translation project, all new or updated translation units are automatically exported and added to three external TMX memories: a native OmegaT TMX, a level 1 TMX and a level 2 TMX.

- The native TMX file is for use in OmegaT projects.
- The level 1 TMX file preserves textual information and can be used with TMX level 1 and 2 supporting CAT tools.
- The level 2 file preserves textual information as well as inline tag information and can be used with TMX level 2 supporting CAT tools.

Exported level 2 files include OmegaT's internal tags encapsulated in TMX tags which allows such TMX files to generate matches in TMX level 2 supporting CAT tools. Tests have been positive in Trados and SDLX.

OmegaT can import TMX files up to version 1.4b level 1 as well as level 2. Level 2 files imported in OmegaT will generate matches of the same level since OmegaT converts the TMX level 2 tags of the foreign TMX. Here again, tests have been positive with TMX files created by Transit.

=== Glossaries ===
For glossaries, OmegaT mainly uses tab-delimited plain text files in UTF-8 encoding with the .txt extension. The structure of a glossary file is extremely simple: the first column contains the source language word, the second column contains the corresponding target language words, the third column (optional) can contain anything including comments on context etc. Such glossaries can easily be created in a text editor.

Similarly structured files in standard CSV format are also supported, as well as TBX files.

== Involvement by community of users ==
=== Localization of OmegaT ===
OmegaT's user interface and documentation have been translated into about 30 languages. Volunteer translators can translate either the user interface, the "Instant Start" short tutorial, or the entire user manual (or all three components). All the language files and all translations of the user manual are included in the standard distribution of OmegaT.

=== User-created programs ===
A characteristic of the OmegaT user community is that deficiencies in OmegaT often prompt users to create macros, scripts and programs that perform those functions, although sometimes those features later become available in OmegaT itself. When OmegaT offered only paragraph segmentation, a user created OpenOffice.org macros for segmenting by sentence. When automatic leveraging of TMs in OmegaT still required TMs to be merged, a user created a TMX merging script. When OmegaT offered no spell-checking support, several users created scripts or found solutions to provide spell-checking as part of an OmegaT based translation process.

== Software built on OmegaT ==
- DGT-OmegaT
- Benten
- Autshumato translation suite
- OmegaT+
- Boltran

== See also ==
- Translation memory
- Computer-assisted translation
- Office Open XML software
- OpenDocument software
