= The Rosetta Foundation =

- Purpose: Humanitarian
- Location: Dublin, Ireland
- Region served: Worldwide
- Website: http://www.therosettafoundation.org/

The Rosetta Foundation is a nonprofit organization that promotes social localization. The Rosetta Foundation was registered as a charitable organization in Ireland. It was an offshoot of the Localization Research Centre (LRC) at the University of Limerick, Ireland, and of the Centre for Next Generation Localization's (CNGL) research initiative, supported by the Irish government.

The Rosetta Foundation developed the Service-Oriented Localization Architecture Solution (SOLAS), whereby volunteer translators and not-for-profit organizations contribute to the translation and distribution of materials for language localization. The first preview of Translation Exchange, now called SOLAS Match, was given on 17 May 2011; the first pilot project using SOLAS Match was launched on 20 October 2012. The Rosetta Foundation launched Translation Commons (or "Trommons") on 18 May 2013.

On 15 June 2017, The Rosetta Foundation merged with Translators Without Borders (TWB). The two now operate jointly under the TWB name. This merger was announced at a Localization World conference in Barcelona.

The foundation was named after the Rosetta Stone.

== Goals ==
As outlined in a paper published by organization founder Reinhard Schaler: Information Sharing across Languages, The Rosetta foundation stated aims is to provide infrastructure for translation and localization.

The concept of "Social Localization" was introduced by Reinhard Schaler, director of the Localization Research Centre at the University of Limerick, at a particular Localization World Silicon Valley session on 10 October 2011. The main objective of social localization is to promote a demand rather than a supply-driven approach to localization. The Rosetta Foundation launched its initiative at a special event in Dublin on 27 October 2011 with volunteers, partner organizations, and funders.

== History ==
=== European launch ===
The European launch occurred at the AGIS '09 conference in Limerick, Ireland, from 21 to 23 September 2009. The president of the University of Limerick, Don Barry, announced the launch of The Rosetta Foundation on 21 September 2009, during his welcoming address to the AGIS '09 delegates. AGIS, Action for Global Information Sharing, provided an opportunity for volunteers, localization specialists, and NGOs to come together.

=== North American launch ===
The North American launch took place at the Localization World conference in Santa Clara, California, on 20 October 2009. This pre-conference workshop provided an overview of the organizational structure and the strategic plan of The Rosetta Foundation. Participants were introduced to the foundation's translation and localization technology platform, GlobalSight.

=== International No Language Barrier Day ===
In 2012, The Rosetta Foundation declared 19 April the international "No Language Barrier Day", meant to raise awareness that access to translation services is an information barrier. The BBB Volunteer Interpretation Service helps communication in Korea, and Interpreters Without Borders from Babel verse.

=== Translation Commons (Trommons) ===
On 18 May 2013, The Rosetta Foundation launched Translation Commons, or Trommons, an open, non-profit space for those offering free community language services. Trommons was powered by the Service-Oriented Localisation Architecture Solution (SOLAS). The Rosetta Foundation switched over overproduction on 8 May 2013, attracting communities from 44 countries within hours.

== Technology platform ==
The Rosetta Foundation is involved in developing GlobalSight and Crowdsight. Both systems are open-source systems originally developed by Transware and then moved into the open-source space by their new owners, We localize, in early 2009. Sponsored by We localize, GlobalSight is an open-source Globalization Management System (GMS) that helps automate tasks associated with the translation, review, and management of global content. CrowdSight is another open-source application fully integrated with GlobalSight. It is used to engage a quick-turn translator for on-demand content. The GlobalSight community has over 1,500 members.

The first preview of Translation eXchange (now SOLAS Match), a component developed as part of The Rosetta Foundation technology platform in collaboration with the Centre for Next Generation Localization (CNGL), was given in a webinar by Reinhard Schaler and Eoin O Conchúir on 17 May 2011. SOLAS Match was developed as part of the Next Generation Localization research track of the CNGL at the University of Limerick and is based on ideas developed at The Rosetta Foundation Design Fest in San Francisco, 5–6 February 2012, by around 25 localization experts.

Service-Oriented Localization Architecture Solution (SOLAS) design is based on the ORM design principles: O-pen (easy to join and to participate), R-ight (serve the task to the volunteer), and M-inimalistic (clear). SOLAS consists of SOLAS Match (matching projects and volunteers) and SOLAS Productivity (a suite of translation productivity tools and technologies). SOLAS Match has been released under an open-source GPL license and can be downloaded from the SOLAS web page. SOLAS Productivity currently consists of six components, all sharing an XLIFF-based common data layer:

- Workflow Recommender (workflow optimization)
- Localization Knowledge Repository (source language checking)
- XLIFF Phoenix (re-use of metadata)
- MT-Mapper (identification of a suitable MT engine)
- LocConnect (orchestration of components)

== International advisory committee ==
Committee Member	Company
Reinhard Schäler	Localisation Research Centre
Alan Barret	Independent
Brian Kelly	Breakout Interactive Ltd
Mahesh Kulkarni	Centre for the Development of Advanced Computing
John Papaioannou	Bentley Systems
Stephen Roantree	Roantree Consulting
Páraic Sheridan	Centre for Next Generation Localisation
Michael Smith	iStockphoto
Francis Tsang	Adobe Systems Inc.
Smith Yewell	Welocalize

== Board of directors ==
Board Member	Company
Reinhard Schäler	Localisation Research Centre
Alan Barret	Independent
Gerry McNally	McNally O'Brien & Co.

== Non-profit Technology Enterprise Network ==
In March 2010, The Rosetta Foundation became a member of the Non-profit Technology Enterprise Network (NTEN), a membership organization made up of individuals, non-profit and for-profit organizations which seeks to support non-profit organizations in their use of technology.

== See also ==
- Internationalization and localization
- Globalization
- Association without lucrative purpose
- Community Organizations
- Master of Nonprofit Organizations
- Mutual organization
- Non-governmental organization (NGO)
- Non-profit organizations and access to public information
- Nonprofit technology
- Occupational safety and health
- Social economy
- Supporting organization (charity)
- Category:Nonprofit organizations
