= SDL Passolo =

- Developer(s): SDL plc
- Stable release: SDL Passolo 2016 / April 2016
- Operating system: Windows
- Type: Software Localization
- License: Commercial
- Website: http://www.sdl.com/solution/language/software-localization/passolo/

SDL Passolo is a specialised visual software localization tool developed to enable the translation of user interfaces.

== History ==
The company PASS Engineering GmbH was founded as a medical analysis system provider in Bonn, Germany, in 1990 and it proved crucial to provide localized medical software. Due to the lack of appropriate tools for doing this, they began to develop their own localization tool which they called Passolo. After first being used internally within their own company, Passolo became available as an independent localization tool in 1998. In June, 2007, SDL acquired PASS Engineering. In 2012 the original development team was released and development and support were transferred to Cluj, Romania.

== About SDL Passolo ==
SDL Passolo is a software localization tool, developed by SDL plc, that is customisable to the users' needs; requiring no programming experience. It allows users to concentrate on the translation by accelerating the many technical aspects of software localization, and it is possible to work in a WYSIWYG (What You See Is What You Get) mode. Should the length of a text string change as a result of the translation (i.e. become longer or shorter), any necessary layout modifications to dialogs and forms can be made directly within the application.

The application offers the tools required to localize all the elements contained in the software, including strings, menus, dialogs, bitmaps, and icons, without requiring access to the source text files or the development environment used for developing the software, as well as providing automatic test functions, interfaces to the major translation memories, and the option of working with all the major Windows formats as well as text files and tagged formats such as XML and HTML.

== Purpose ==
SDL Passolo allows the user to:

- Use the visual localization environment to see which translation is best when no context is available
- View the translation of dialog boxes and menus in real-time (WYSIWYG) and adjust them accordingly
- Fully customise SDL Passolo to meet their needs with an integrated development environment
- Integrate SDL Passolo into their workflow management systems or development environment

== Editions ==
- SDL Passolo Translator Edition: The Translator Edition is a free editor that can be downloaded from the company website. It allows translators to edit the bundles created with the Team or Collaboration Edition. It offers all functions except parse source files or generate target files.
- SDL Passolo Essential: SDL Passolo Essential is included as an application within the latest version of SDL Trados. This edition allows users to create and translate projects, as well as generate localized target files.
- Professional Edition: The Professional Edition is a stand-alone solution which is particularly suited for localization projects of a medium to large size. It supports operations covering compound modules. As the edition is integrated with SDL Trados and SDL MultiTerm, translation data can be exported in order to use while translating relevant manuals and online help. It can also be used for data exchange with other systems. The integrated script development environment also makes it possible to change or add functions to SDL Passolo.
- Team Edition: The Team Edition offers the same functions as the Professional. In addition, it can be used to create and administer a certain number of licensed translation bundles. These translation bundles can be processed using the free Translator Edition. The Team Edition has three different options, depending on the number of translation bundles used in a particular project, with the option of 5, 10 or unlimited bundles.
- Collaboration Edition: The Collaboration edition offers the same functions as the Team Edition. In addition it can create translation bundles that can be synchronized with the original project via a network folder or FTP server. When the "Synchronize Exports" function is called all source file changes are sent to the translation bundle and all current translations are sent back to the project. There is no need to import and re-export the bundles to have the project and the bundle up-to-date.

== System requirements ==
SDL Passolo runs on Windows Vista, Windows 7 or Windows 10. It is also able to localize software for Windows 9x.
