= Across =

Across may refer to:

== Technology and engineering ==
- Across Language Server, a software platform
- ACROSS Project, an R&D project in social robotics
- Suzuki Across (motorcycle), a motorcycle manufactured by Suzuki
- Suzuki Across (crossover), an automobile based on the Toyota RAV4

== Arts and entertainment ==
- Across Entertainment, a Japanese voice-acting agency
- Across, a musical project of American rapper Lil Ugly Mane
- Across, a 2014 EP by Kilo Kish
- ACROSS, a fictional secret organization which is the subject of the manga and anime series Excel Saga

== See also ==
- Accross, a short name of Accrington and Rossendale College
