= Anuvaad (document translation platform) =

Open-source Document Translation platform

Project Anuvaad
- Developer: EkStep Foundation
- Release: September 1, 2019; 7 years ago
- Written in: Python
- Operating system: Windows, macOS, Linux
- Type: Document Translation platform
- License: MIT License
- Website: anuvaad.org
- Repository: github.com/project-anuvaad/anuvaad

Project Anuvaad is an open-source document translation platform to translate documents in Indic languages at scale. Anuvaad provides editing capabilities with a maker-checker flow, along with plug-and-play NMT models. It was bootstrapped by EkStep Foundation in late 2019 as a solution to enable easier translation of legal documents between English and Indic languages. Creating Anuvaad platform allowed legal entities to digitize and translate the Orders/Judgements using an easy-to-use user interface.

== Overview ==
Anuvaad leverages state-of-the-art AI/ML models, including NMT, OCR, Layout detection to provide a high level of accuracy. Project Anuvaad was envisioned as an end-to-end, open-source solution for document translation across multiple domains.

== Instances ==
Independent instances of Anuvaad was deployed in Supreme Court of India (SUVAS) and Supreme Court of Bangladesh (Amar Vasha). As of Oct 2023, more than 40k legal documents were translated & reviewed across 22 Indic languages, using this platform.
