= MultiTerm =

SDL MultiTerm
- Developer: SDL Plc
- Stable release: SDL MultiTerm 2017 SR1 14.1.2471.5 / September 2017
- Operating system: Windows
- Type: Terminology Software
- License: Commercial
- Website: www.sdltrados.com

MultiTerm is a terminology management tool providing one solution to store and manage multilingual terminology.

== History ==
MultiTerm was launched in 1990 by Trados GmbH as a terminology database for translation professionals. Trados was acquired by SDL plc in 2005, with MultiTerm being renamed SDL MultiTerm. SDL merged with RWS in 2020, and the name reverted to MultiTerm.

== About MultiTerm ==
MultiTerm Desktop is the desktop terminology management tool from RWS. It can be used by translators and terminologists as a standalone desktop tool to manage terminology, or it can be integrated with Trados Studio to increase translation productivity and accuracy.

== Features ==
MultiTerm allows the user to:

- Customize termbases with descriptive fields to provide more information about the term
- Insert digital media files and hyperlink to URLs to terms in the termbase
- Store an unlimited number of terms in unlimited languages
- Import and export terms from different technology environments, such as Microsoft Excel
- Integrate with Trados Studio to improve translation consistency

== Components of MultiTerm ==
=== MultiTerm Desktop ===
MultiTerm Desktop is a database application that allows the user to create, manage and present terminology. Terms can be added and searched in a wide variety of languages, allowing for consistent use of brand terms.

=== MultiTerm Extract ===
MultiTerm Extract is a tool used to create glossaries of terminology using existing translated documents. The software does this by using a statistical algorithm to examine the frequency of terms at a sub-segment level. This allows translators to build project glossaries without having to manually search for the terms.

=== MultiTerm Widget ===
MultiTerm Widget is a lightweight application that immediately retrieves meaning and translation of highlighted words from any application on a desktop based on the user's project glossaries and translation memories.

== System requirements ==
SDL MultiTerm 2017 Desktop is a Unicode application and can therefore be used only on Windows 7, Windows 8 or Windows 10. SDL recommend at least a Pentium® IV-based computer with 2 GB RAM.

== Criticism ==
Entering terms individually is a time-consuming process. This is somewhat circumvented by the use of SDL's Glossary Converter, which allows terminology from other sources to be converted to a MultiTerm termbase, and by allowing translators to create term entries while translating in SDL Trados Studio. Contrary to certain claims, the TBX interchange format (ISO 30042:2008) is not supported. Whilst TBX files cannot be imported directly, they can be converted to a MultiTerm termbase by SDL Convert or SDL Glossary Converter. Support for terminology relations is only possible through the use of cross-references, but you cannot designate the type of relation between terms.
