= Fuzzy matching =

Fuzzy matching may refer to:

- Probabilistic record linkage
- Fuzzy matching (computer-assisted translation)
