= UTX =

UTX may refer to:

- United Technologies Corporation, an American multinational conglomerate based in Hartford, Connecticut.
- Universal Terminology eXchange, a set of formats for machine translation user dictionaries.
- Ubiquitously transcribed tetratricopeptide repeat, X chromosome, a human gene.
- University of Texas, more commonly abbreviated UT
