= IMTS =

IMTS can refer to:

- Improved Mobile Telephone Service
- International Manufacturing Technology Show
- Intelligent Multimode Transit System, guided buses

== See also ==
- IMT (disambiguation)
