= Pre-editing =

Human preparation of a document for machine translation

Pre-editing is the process whereby a human prepares a document before applying machine translation. The main goal of pre-editing is to reduce the post-editing workload by adapting the source document to improve the raw output of the machine translation. Pre-editing could be also valuable for human translation projects since it can increase the application of the translation memory.

In general, pre-editing is worth to apply when there are more than three target languages. In this case, pre-editing should facilitate the process of machine translation by spell and grammar checking, avoiding complex or ambiguous syntactic structure, and verifying term consistency. However, it is also applicable to poorly-converted files. Linguistic pre-editing is more important than pre-editing of the format since errors can affect machine translation quality.
