= Across Language Server =

- Developer: Across Systems GmbH
- Stable release: 7.0 / 2019-02-13
- Type: Computer-assisted translation
- License: proprietary
- Website: across.net

Across Language Server is a software platform for computer-assisted translation (CAT) that includes features for the management of projects. The software is produced and sold by Across Systems GmbH, a company located and founded in Karlsbad in 2005 as a Corporate spin-off of Nero AG and which maintains an additional site in Glendale, California.

The functional principle is similar to the one SDL Trados, XTM and memoQ feature: Just like the server solutions of these two programs, Across Language Server also saves translation units or terminology entries (depending on the project's configuration) into a local or a central MSSQL database.

Besides the "Server", which is available in different versions, there is also a single-user version called Across Translator Edition, working with a local MS-SQL database. This single-user application is able to connect to the server, enabling to work on both local and Across-Server-based projects. Freelance translators can acquire the Basic Edition of the single-user version for free.

== History ==
Version 5 of the MS-SQL-database-based Across Language Server was launched in 2009. Version 6 of Across Language Server was released on 2 July 2014. Version 6.3 was introduced on 26 November 2015. Version 7.0 was introduced on 13 February 2019. In this version common machine translation systems were integrated (e.g. DeepL or SYSTRAN). Version 7 also allows users to concurrently open and edit multiple tasks within a project.

== Reviews ==
The software is mostly reviewed unfavourably, with users criticizing its design, usability and overall quality.
