= MTPE =

MTPE can refer to:

- Machine translation postediting
- Ministry of Labour and Promotion of Employment of Perú, known by the Spanish abbreviation MTPE
- Mission To Planet Earth, an alternate name of the NASA Earth Science program
