= XML Professional Publisher =

XML Professional Publisher (XPP) is an automated XML based publishing system that was developed out of a proprietary typesetting system.

XPP is a standards-based, content formatting and publishing application for the automatic composition, transformation, and rendering of XML, SGML or tagged ASCII content into high-quality output into PostScript and PDF format. It holds the XML or SGML in its native format and it is able to re-export the data after paper pagination, even if corrections have been made in XPP. The software is used worldwide to produce a wide variety of publications including Technical Documentation, Scientific, Medical Journals (STM) Directory, Dictionary and Legal loose-leaf publishing.

XPP was originally, in the early 1980s, a proprietary system which included the software and hardware. It was one of the first systems to combine high speed batch composition with an interactive mode displaying WYSIWYG pages. Originally Xyvision was built using its own display hardware as off-the-shelf hardware at that time was not up to the task of rapidly displaying pages. Over the years as readily available hardware became more powerful, Xyvision moved away from its own hardware to become a software-only vendor. Xyvision was a publicly held company and evolved in 1995 into the privately owned company called XyEnterprise. XyEnterprise currently employs some 80 people to develop and maintain the XPP software as well as supporting its other products, Contenta, an intelligent XML content management system and LiveContent, an information products delivery platform. XyEnterprise was subsequently bought by SDL and in turn SDL merged with RWS. XPP can be used as a stand-alone system or in conjunction with Contenta and LiveContent.

Each page within XPP is stored as a separate file, which allows XPP to open up a document at every page and reformat this page as a separate unit. XPP can even compose a single line as a separate unit. The ability to handle pages as individual objects means that it is well suited to loose-leaf publications.

The software also has a very active User group which helps communicate back to RWS what the users want to see in the future, and is usually incorporated into successive new versions.

Version 9.4 increases the use of CSS to do page layouts as well as the typographic styling introduced at 9.0.
