= MetaTexis =

Software

- Developer: Hermann Bruns
- Stable release: MetaTexis for Word v.3.171 / MetaTexis Server v.3.15 / October 2012
- Operating system: Windows
- Type: Computer-assisted translation
- License: Commercial software
- Website: www.metatexis.com

The name MetaTexis is used for several software products developed by MetaTexis Software and Services. The main software products are MetaTexis for Word and the MetaTexis Server. MetaTexis for Word is a translation memory software, also called a Computer-assisted translation tool (CAT tool), that runs inside Microsoft Word. The MetaTexis Server is a server software for translation memories (TMs) and terminology databases (TDBs) that allows numerous translators to work with the same TMs and TDBs via LAN or Internet.

MetaTexis Software and Services is based in Trier, Germany.

== History ==
The first version of MetaTexis for Word was released in July 2002. From the start, MetaTexis for Word used the COM-add-in technology for MS Word. Since then, the software has continually been extended and improved. Version 3 of MetaTexis for Word was released in September 2010.

In 2006 the first version of the MetaTexis Server was released.

== Products ==
=== MetaTexis for Word ===
MetaTexis for Word is a so-called COM-add-in that runs in Microsoft Word on Windows. The functions are available via a menu, a toolbar, and/or a ribbon inside Microsoft Word. A document translated in MetaTexis for Word is converted into a bilingual document (containing both the source text and the translation). The text is segmented, and the segments are presented to the translator one after another. When the translation is finished, the final, translated document is created through a clean-up process. The workflow is similar to older Trados versions or Wordfast Classic.

== Supported source document formats ==
MetaTexis for Word can handle any format that is supported by Microsoft Word. Such files include plain text files, Word documents (DOC/DOCX), Microsoft Excel (XLS/XLSX), PowerPoint (PPT/PPTX), Rich Text Format (RTF), HTML, XML, TRADOS Word documents, TRADOS TagEditor (TTX), TRADOS Studio (SDLXLIFF), Manual Maker, and several further formats.

== Supported translation memory and glossary formats ==
MetaTexis can use five professional database engines to save and administer the translation memory and terminology data.

The MetaTexis products can also import and export several file types for the exchange of data, especially TMX files, which allow translation memory exchange with other translation memory tools. MetaTexis can also import TBX files for terminology exchange with other CAT tools.

The MetaTexis programs support multiple TMs and glossaries. The size of TMs and TDBs is only limited by the database engine used and by the database storage and the computing capacity of the system where the software is installed.

MetaTexis for Word can access the MetaTexis Server and other server-based TMs, and MetaTexis can retrieve data from machine translation services that are available via the internet (including Google Translate and Microsoft Translator).

== See also ==
- Computer-assisted translation
