= Social localisation =

Phase of societal and cultural adaptation

Social localisation (or localization) (Note: The spelling "localization," a variant of "localisation," is the preferred spelling in the United States.) (from Latin locus (place) and the English term locale, "a place where something happens or is set") is, like language localization the second phase of a larger process of product and service translation and cultural adaptation (for specific countries, regions or groups) to account for differences in distinct markets and societies, a process known as internationalization and localization.

== Objectives ==
The main objective of social localisation is the promotion of a demand, rather than a supply-driven approach to localization. It is based on the recognition that it is no longer exclusively the corporations who control the global conversation, but the communities. Social localization supports user-driven and needs-based localisation scenarios - in contrast to mainstream localization, driven primarily by short-term financial return-on-investment (ROI) considerations.

Social localization has been connected to the nonmarket activities of the translation and localisation services sector by researchers reporting to the LINDWEB Conference, organized by the European Commission's DGT as the Language Industry Platform, allowing its stakeholders to meet in Brussels on 24 May 2012. The concept of a 'nonmarket' approach to economics and to societal activities is a well-known concept and has been reported on in the context of the economics of development, education and poverty reduction, for example.

== See also ==
- The Rosetta Foundation
- Internationalization and localization
- Globalization
- American and British English differences
- Spanish dialects and varieties
- Variety (linguistics)
