= IMT =

IMT may refer to:

- IMT, the IATA code for Ford Airport (Iron Mountain), Michigan, US
- In Melbourne Tonight, an Australian TV show
- Individual movement techniques
- International Military Tribunal, the Nuremberg trials
- Institute for Military Technology at Royal Danish Defence College
- Incident management team
- An abbreviation of the word, immortality

== Organizations ==
- IMT Gallery, an art gallery in London, UK
- Immortals, an American esports organization
- Industry of Machinery and Tractors, a Serbian producer and vendor of tractors and agricultural machinery
- Institut de Mathématiques de Toulouse
- Institut Mines-Télécom, a French public institution for higher education and research
- Inter Moengotapoe, a Surinamese football club
- FK IMT, a Serbian football club
- International Marxist Tendency
- Islamic Movement of Turkestan

== Science, technology and health ==
- IANA Media Type, a two-part identifier for file formats and format contents transmitted on the Internet
- IMT-2000, mobile telecommunications specifications
- Information manipulation theory, an interpersonal communication theory dealing with deceptive messages
- Inspiratory muscle training, a breathing muscles training method
- Intelligent manual transmission, its acronym is usually stylized as iMT.
- Interactive machine translation, a sub-field of computer-aided translation
- Intima-media thickness, a measurement of the thickness of artery walls. Also expressed: Carotid intimal-medial thickness.
- Invertible matrix theorem, a theorem giving equivalent statements for matrices that have an inverse.
