= Service-Oriented Localisation Architecture Solution =

The Service-Oriented Localisation Architecture Solution (SOLAS) /ˈsɒləs/, enables the global conversation in communities and is an open source project of The Rosetta Foundation.

== History ==
SOLAS was conceived at The Rosetta Foundation Design Fest in San Francisco, 5–6 February 2011. The original design was further developed as an open translation and localisation space at the Localisation Research Centre (LRC) at the University of Limerick (UL) in Ireland, part-financed by the Centre for Next Generation Localisation (CNGL), a Centre for Science, Engineering and Technology (CSET), supported by Science Foundation Ireland (SFI), the Irish Governments research funding agency, and industry partners. A YouTube video was published on 18 February 2011. SOLAS was demonstrated at the AGIS (Action for Global Information Sharing) event in Addis Ababa, Ethiopia, in December 2011.

== ORM design principles ==
The SOLAS Design is based on the ORM Design Principles: O-pen (easy to join and to participate), R-ight (serve the right task to the right volunteer), and M-inimalistic (crisp, clear, uncluttered). SOLAS consists of SOLAS Match (matching projects and volunteers) and SOLAS Productivity (as suite of translation productivity tools and language resources). The ORM Design Principles guiding the design of SOLAS were introduced by Reinhard Schäler, Director LRC at the University of Limerick, Ireland, at the LRC XVII – Social Localisation event and at TM-Europe (Warsaw, 4–5 October 2012).

== Open source and open standards ==
SOLAS Match has been released under an open source GPL license and can be downloaded from the SOLAS web page. SOLAS has implemented open standards developed by the localisation community in OASIS (XLIFF) and the W3C (ITS).

== SOLAS architecture ==
SOLAS is made up of SOLAS Match and SOLAS Productivity.

=== SOLAS Match ===
SOLAS Match is an open translation and localisation space that allow individuals with translation skills to find and download translation tasks in an intuitive and user-friendly way; it also allows communities with translation requirements to upload translation tasks. SOLAS Match has been used by The Rosetta Foundation successfully in a number of pilot projects.

=== SOLAS Productivity ===
SOLAS Productivity supports the work of individuals working on translation tasks by offering them an easy-to-use translation environment and access to language and linguistic resources. SOLAS Productivity currently consists of six components, all sharing an XLIFF-based common data layer:

- Workflow Recommender (workflow optimisation)
- Localisation Knowledge Repository (source language checking)
- XLIFF Phoenix (re-use of metadata)
- MT-Mapper (identification of suitable MT engine)
- LocConnect (orchestration of components)

== People ==
=== Contributors ===
At the University of Limerick:

- Asanka Wasala
- Aram Morera Mesa
- Chris Exton
- Jim Buckley
- J.J. Collins
- Lucia Morado
- Naoto Nishio
- Reinhard Schäler
- Solomon Gizaw
