= GlobalSight =

- Initial release: 1997
- Stable release: 8.7.3 / March 20, 2017
- Operating system: Linux, Windows
- Type: Translation management system
- License: Apache License 2.0
- Website: http://www.globalsight.com/

GlobalSight is a free and open source translation management system (TMS) released under the Apache License 2.0. As of version 7.1 it supports the TMX and SRX 2.0 Localization Industry Standards Association standards. It was developed in the Java programming language and uses a MySQL database. GlobalSight also supports computer-assisted translation and machine translation.

== History ==
From 1997 to 2005 it was called Ambassador Suite and was developed and owned by GlobalSight Corp. that according to Red Herring magazine was one of the "ten companies to watch" in 1999. In 2005, Transware Inc. acquired it and continued its development. In May 2008, Welocalize acquired Transware and GlobalSight. In January 2009 after replacing the proprietary technology used in the product (workflow, database, object relationship mapping, middleware, directory management and scheduling) with open source components Welocalize released version 7.1.

== Steering committee ==
The Steering committee formed by representatives of the main companies currently involved in the project are listed here.

- Stephen Roantree from AOL
- Mirko Plitt from Autodesk
- Jessica Roland from EMC Corporation
- Frank Rojas from IBM
- Daniel McGowan from Novell
- Martin Wunderlich
- Melissa Biggs from Sun Microsystems
- Tex Texin from XenCraft
- Reinhard Schaler from The Rosetta Foundation
- Phil Ritchie from VistaTEC
- Sultan Ghaznawi from YYZ Translations
- Derek Coffey from Welocalize

== Other companies involved ==
In December 2008 there were four Language Service Providers involved in the project: Afghan Translation Service, Applied Language Solutions, Lloyd International Translations and VistaTEC.

== Features ==
According to the Translator and Reviewer Training Guide and the GlobalSight vs WorldServer, the software has the following features:

- Customized workflows, created and edited using graphical workflow editor
- Support for both human translation and fully integrated machine translation (MT)
- Automation of many traditionally manual steps in the localization process, including: filtering and segmentation, TM leveraging, analysis, costing, file handoffs, email notifications, TM update, target file generation
- Translation Memory (TM) management and leveraging, including multilingual TMs, and the ability to leverage from multiple TMs
- In Context Exact matching, as well as exact and fuzzy matching
- Terminology management and leveraging
- Centralized and simplified Translation memory and terminology management
- Full support for translation processes that utilize multiple Language Service Providers (LSPs)
- Two online translation editors
- Support for desktop Computer Aided Translation (CAT) tools such as Trados
- Cost calculation based on configurable rates for each step of the localization process
- Filters for dozens of filetypes, including Word, RTF, PowerPoint, Excel, XML, HTML, JavaScript, PHP, ASP, JSP, Java Properties, Frame, InDesign, etc.
- Concordance search
- Alignment mechanism for generating Translation memory from previously translated documents
- Reporting
- Web services API for programmatic access to GlobalSight functionality and data
- Although a plugin called Crowdsight intended to extend the functionality and support crowdsourcing, GlobalSight was found not suitable to support crowdsourcing processes that depend on redundant inputs.

== Integration with other platforms ==
In 2011, Globalme Language & Technology released an open source plugin which connects the back end of a Drupal or Wordpress website to GlobalSight. Publishers can send their content directly to GlobalSight using this CMS plugin.

Drupal CMS In 2014 Globalme and Welocalize published an open source Drupal plugin to provide integration capabilities with the Drupal TMGMT translation management plugin.
