= Translation Bureau =

Institution of the government of Canada

The Translation Bureau is an institution of the federal government of Canada operated by Public Services and Procurement Canada that provides translation services for all agencies, boards, commissions, and departments of the government. As of December 2022, the bureau employs 130 interpreters, of which about 70 are on staff and 60 are freelancers. It is one of the largest "government organizations dedicated to translation".

The bureau was transferred from the Department of the Secretary of State to Public Works and Government Services Canada in June 1993, when the then government reorganized agencies to consolidate groups primarily tasked with providing services to other government organizations, referred to as common service organizations (CSOs).

The number of interpreters employed by the bureau affects the number of Parliamentary committee sessions that can be conducted. Freelance interpreters are not accredited by the Translation Bureau. Public Services and Procurement Canada only works with accredited interpreters, prioritizing those with an open contract.

Tasks of interpreters include live interpretation during House of Commons debates and committee meetings, and translation of documentation such as Acts of Parliament, bills, correspondence, and reports.

The bureau has investigated the use of various technologies to provide its services, including neural machine translation and artificial intelligence. It has used a statistical machine translation system named Portage developed by the National Research Council Canada since 2016. This system is used in conjunction with human translators.

In January 2019, the bureau began providing translation services in Dene, East Cree, Plains Cree, and Mohawk.

== See also ==
- TERMIUM Plus
