= SDL plc =

British multinational professional services company

SDL
- Type: Public
- Traded as: LSE: SDL
- Industry: Computer software Professional services Language localization Component content management Digital asset management
- Founded: 1992
- Headquarters: Maidenhead, Berkshire, United Kingdom
- Key people: Adolfo Hernandez (chief executive officer)
- Revenue: £376.3 million (2019)
- Operating income: £29.7 million (2019)
- Net income: £19.6 million (2019)
- Number of employees: 4,242 (2019)
- Website: www.sdl.com

SDL plc was a British multinational professional services company based in Maidenhead, Berkshire, United Kingdom. SDL specialized in language translation software and services (including interpretation services). It was listed on the London Stock Exchange until it was acquired by RWS Group in November 2020.

== Name ==
SDL is an abbreviation for "Software and Documentation Localization".

== History ==
The company was founded by Mark Lancaster with nine employees in 1992. It opened its first overseas office in France in 1996 and was first listed on the London Stock Exchange in 1999. The company grew organically and via acquisitions. SDL acquired Polylang Multimedia in 1998, International Translation & Publishing (ITP) in 2000, Alpnet in 2001, and the machine translation (MT) assets of Transparent Language in 2001. It bought Trados, a rival translation memory (TM) developer, in 2005. In 2007, the company acquired Tridion, a content management system vendor, and PASS Engineering, developers of the Passolo software.

In 2008, it bought Idiom Technologies, a global information system management business. In July 2009 SDL acquired XyEnterprise in an all-cash transaction to add XML Professional Publisher as well as Contenta content management software and LiveContent to manage and deliver XML. This unit combined with Trisoft formerly Infoshare. In December 2009, SDL acquired Fredhopper, a Dutch eCommerce onsite search and navigation, onsite targeting and targeted advertising software vendor. Later that same year, it bought Xopus, another Dutch company and the leader in online XML editing. In May 2011 SDL acquired Dutch-based Media Asset Management company, Calamares, in 2012 the campaign management and social media analytics company, Alterian, and in 2013, bemoko, a supplier of internet software for mobile devices.

In January 2016, having undertaken a strategic review, SDL announced the divestment of Fredhopper and Alterian as non-complementary to its new strategy.

In August 2020 RWS Group announced a proposed takeover of the company for £809 million. The transaction was completed on 4 November 2020.

== Operations ==
SDL provided software for language translation purposes.
