= TERMIUM Plus =

Electronic database

- Website type: terminology and linguistic database
- Founded: 1976
- Predecessor: Banque de Terminologie de l’Université de Montréal
- Owners: Translation Bureau, Public Services and Procurement Canada
- Website: www.btb.termiumplus.gc.ca
- Commercial: No

TERMIUM Plus is an electronic linguistic and terminological database operated and maintained by the Translation Bureau of Public Services and Procurement Canada, a department of the federal government. The database offers millions of terms in English and French from various specialized fields, as well as some in Spanish and Portuguese.

== History ==
TERMIUM Plus was initially developed by the Université de Montréal in October 1970, under the name Banque de Terminologie de l’Université de Montréal (BTUM). The database was under the direction of Marcel Paré, with a vision to produce the most flexible bilingual language file that would be available to all. BTUM was initially funded by private donors and government subsidies, subsequently growing with the help of professionals in the field of translation over the following years.

At the end of 1974, however, the Translation Bureau under the Secretary of State for Canada's department showed interest in the operation of BTUM. The goal of the Bureau at the time was to standardize terminology throughout the public service, as well as the federal public administration.

In 1975, the BTUM was able to obtain data and user responses in collaboration with the language services of Bell Canada.

In January 1976, the Secretary of State officially acquired BTUM, and renamed the database TERMIUM (TERMInologie Université de Montréal). The system was then transferred to the central computer of the federal government in Ottawa, and began to integrate approximately 175,000 files that the BTUM initially compiled with the files that the Translation Bureau had been working on. In the years to follow, the Bureau began the sorting process, along with the input process onto the computer. The database grew to 900,000 records by 1987.

=== Development ===
As terminological records grew in the TERMIUM database, the Canadian government received a proposal in 1985 from a Toronto-based company to launch TERMIUM in a CD-ROM format, in order to make the database more accessible to users. By fall of 1987, a pilot project for CD-ROM was launched to investigate the responses from its users, which included services under the Translation Bureau and other private Canadian companies. After some data compilation and investigation, the Bureau incorporated an indexing system to improve the speed and accuracy of term extraction.

By 1990, TERMIUM on CD-ROM was commercially available through subscription (with an annual fee of $1,100 to $1,500). Updates were released every three to four months. In 1996, TERMIUM on CD-ROM received an award from ATIO (the Association of Translators and Interpreters of Ontario).

In October 2009, TERMIUM Plus and an array of language tools under the Language Portal of Canada were launched with free online access.

== Features ==
TERMIUM was initially developed to contain terminological records in both of Canada’s official languages (English and French). As the system upgraded to its third-generation version in 1985, it contained records in other languages such as Spanish, in order to accommodate its growing range of users. However, in these “multilingual” records, the term in the source language would be in English or French, with its equivalent in a non-official language.

Currently, there is a vast collection of specialized domains and fields covered by TERMIUM Plus, ranging from administration (including appellations), arts, sciences to law and justice.

Aside from the millions of entries recorded by TERMIUM Plus, the database also contains writing tools for both the English and French language (such as The Canadian Style, a writing style guide; and Dictionnaire des cooccurrences, a guide to French collocations), archived glossaries, as well as a link to the Language Portal of Canada (containing various French and English writing resources).

== See also ==
- vidby
- DeeplL
- Duolingo
