= Déjà Vu (software) =

- Developer: Atril
- Stable release: Dejà Vu X3 (version 9.0.807) / March 2022; 3 years ago
- Operating system: Windows
- Type: Computer-assisted translation
- License: Proprietary
- Website: www.atril.com

Déjà Vu is a computer-assisted translation tool with its own program interface. It facilitates database-supported translation.

Development and marketing of this translation environment tool (TEnT) is handled by Atril, which has its international headquarters in Paris, France.

The latest major release of the software is Déjà Vu X3, released in July 2015, with Déjà Vu X3 9.0.807 being the most recent point release, released in March 2022.

== History ==
The first version of Déjà Vu was published in 1993 and used the Microsoft Word interface. In 1996, this approach was abandoned, and the software was given its own program interface.

In 2004, the founder Emilio Benito died and his son, Daniel Benito, Head of R&D and Déjà Vu co-creator, continued running the company. Beginning in March 2009, PowerLing became the exclusive distributor for Déjà Vu in Germany, Austria and Switzerland. They began operating in France, the Netherlands, Belgium and Luxembourg in April, and in the United Kingdom, Ireland and the US and Canada in July. In January 2011, Powerling increased ATRIL's capital by taking out a controlling stake.

Déjà Vu has been one of the leading CAT (Computer Assisted Translation) tools for many years along with SDL Trados, Wordfast and others.

== Supported source document formats ==
Déjà Vu can process many file formats: Microsoft Office (Word, Excel, Powerpoint, also embedded objects, and Access), Help Contents (CNT), FrameMaker (MIF), Aldus PageMaker, QuarkXPress, QuickSilver/Interleaf ASCII, Java Properties (.properties), HTML, HTML Help, XML, RC, C/Java/C++, IBM TM/2, Trados Workbench, Trados BIF (old TagEditor), Trados TagEditor, JavaScript, VBScript, ODBC, TMX, EBU, InDesign (TXT, ITD, INX, IDML), GNU GetText (PO/POT), OpenOffice, OpenDocument SDLX (ITD), ResX, XLIFF (XLF, XLIF, XLIFF, MQXLIFF, unsegmented and segmented SDLXLIFF), Visio (VDX), PDF, Transit NXT PPF, WordFast Pro TXML, SubRip, TIPP, YAML.
