= Wordfast =

- Developer(s): Yves Champollion
- Stable release: WFC v.6.45 / WFP3 v.4.8 / WFP4 v.8.2 / Wordfast Anywhere v.4.10.5 / WFC June 2016/ WFP3 July 2016 / WFP4 July 2016 / WFA June 2016
- Operating system: Windows XP and higher, Mac OSX 10.5 and higher with Java (Wordfast Pro 3) / Windows 7 and higher, Mac OSX 10.9 and higher with Java (Wordfast Pro 4), any with Microsoft Word 97 or higher (Wordfast Classic), Windows 2000 or higher (Wordfast Server), recent web browser (Wordfast Anywhere)
- Type: Computer-assisted translation
- License: Commercial software
- Website: www.wordfast.com, www.wordfast.net

The name Wordfast is used for any number of translation memory products developed by Wordfast LLC. The original Wordfast product, now called Wordfast Classic, was developed by Yves Champollion in 1999 as a cheaper alternative to Trados, a translation memory program. The current Wordfast products run on a variety of platforms but use largely compatible translation memory formats, and often also have similar workflows. Wordfast LLC is based in Delaware, United States, although most of the development takes place in Paris, France. There is also a support center in the Czech Republic. The company has around 50 employees.

== History ==
Development on Wordfast version 1 (then called simply Wordfast) was begun in 1999 in Paris, France, by Yves Champollion. It was made up of a set of macros that ran inside Microsoft Word, version 97 or higher. At that time, other translation memory programs also worked inside Microsoft Word, for example, Trados.

Until late 2002, this MS Word-based tool (now known as Wordfast Classic) was freeware.

In 2006, the company Wordfast LLC was founded by Phil Shawe and Elizabeth Elting, also co-owners of the translation company TransPerfect. In July 2006, Mr. Champollion sold all interest in the Wordfast Server computer program to Wordfast LLC. Since that time, Wordfast has been the sole owner of all rights, title, and interest, including the copyright, in the Wordfast Server Code. Since then, Champollion, while holding the title Founder and Chief Architect, has also been CEO and president of the company Wordfast LLC.

== Supported translation memory and glossary formats ==
The original Wordfast translation memory format was a simple tab-delimited text file that can be opened and edited in a text editor. Wordfast products can also import and export TMX files for memory exchange with other major commercial CAT tools. Wordfast's original glossary format was a simple tab-delimited text file. These formats are still used today by Wordfast Anywhere, Wordfast Classic, Wordfast Server, and Wordfast Pro 3 (TM only, not the glossary). Wordfast Pro 5 uses a database format for the TM and glossary. The transition to a database format was made to increase the TM and glossary size limitations (e.g. from 1 million to 5 million translation units) as well as improve concordance search speeds.

== Copyright matter ==
According to an October 2017 court filing in New York State Supreme Court, after the sale of Wordfast to Wordfast LLC, Wordfast allowed the Wordfast Server Code, together with the Wordfast trademark, to be used by TransPerfect translation company, pursuant to a non-exclusive license. The lawsuit challenges a custodian appointed by a Delaware judge to sell TransPerfect, accusing him of Copyright Infringement, or pirating the code, to enhance the valuation of the firm.

== See also ==
- Computer-assisted translation
