= Universal Terminology eXchange =

UTX (Universal Terminology eXchange) is a simple glossary format. UTX is developed by AAMT (Asia-Pacific Association for Machine Translation).

A tab-separated text format that contains minimal information, such as source language entry, target language entry, and part-of-speech entry. UTX is intended to facilitate rapid creation and quick exchanges of human-readable and machine-readable glossaries.

Initially, UTX was created to absorb the differences between various user dictionary formats for machine translation. The scope of the format was later expanded to include other purposes, such as glossaries for human translations, natural language processing, thesaurus, text-to-speech, input method, etc.

UTX could be used to improve the efficiency of localization for open source projects.

== UTX Converter ==
UTX Converter was developed as an open source project by AAMT. UTX Converter is available for free.

It has the following functions:

- Functions for UTX
  - The format check of a UTX file (UTX 1.11)
  - Extraction of forbidden terms
  - Extraction of the pairs of forbidden terms and approved terms
  - Extraction of the pairs of non-standard terms and approved terms
- Conversion function
  - Conversion between UTX and a user dictionary (*. txt file) of ATLAS (Fujitsu)
  - Conversion between UTX and a user dictionary (*. txt file) of The Honyaku (Toshiba)
  - Conversion between UTX and a user dictionary (*.opt file for EJ, *.dic file for JE) of PC/MED/PAT/Legal Transer (Cross Language)
  - Conversion from UTX to a text for MultiTerm import

== See also ==
- TBX
- Translation memory
- Terminology
- Computer-assisted translation
