= Infoscope =

An infoscope is a handheld device composed of a digital camera and wireless internet access. The device was conceived and developed by Ismail Haritaoglu at IBM's Almaden Research Center and can be used to translate foreign languages by photographing the text then sending the image to a remote computer via the internet for translation. It was named as one of Time Magazine's 2002 "Best Inventions."
