= Image translation =

Form of translation

Image translation is the machine translation of images of printed text (posters, banners, menus, screenshots etc.). This is done by applying optical character recognition (OCR) technology to an image to extract any text contained in the image, and then have this text translated into a language of their choice, and the applying digital image processing on the original image to get the translated image with a new language.

== General ==
Machine translation made available on the internet (web and mobile) is a notable advance in multilingual communication eliminating the need for an intermediary translator/interpreter, translating foreign texts still poses a problem to the user as they cannot be expected to be able to type the foreign text they wish to translate and understand. Manually entering the foreign text may prove to be a difficulty especially in cases where an unfamiliar alphabet is used from a script which user can't read, e.g. Cyrillic, Chinese, Japanese etc. for an English speaker or any speaker of a Latin-based language or vice versa.

The technical advancements in OCR made it possible to recognize text from images. The possibility to use one's mobile device's camera to capture and extract printed text is also known as mobile OCR and was first introduced in Japanese manufactured mobile telephones in 2004. Using the handheld's camera one could take a picture of (a line of) text and have it extracted (digitalized) for further manipulation such as storing the information in their contacts list, as a web page address (URL) or text to use in an SMS/email message etc.

Presently, mobile devices having a camera resolution of 2 megapixels or above with an auto-focus ability, often feature the text scanner service. Taking the text scanning facility one step further, image translation emerged, giving users the ability to capture text with their mobile phone's camera, extract the text, and have it translated in their own language.

More and more applications emerged on this technology including Word Lens. After getting acquired by Google, it was made a part of Google Translate mobile app.

Another simultaneous advancement in Image Processing, has also made it possible now to replace the text on the image with the translated text and create a new image altogether.

== History ==
The development of the image translation service springs from the advances in OCR technology (miniaturization and reduction of memory resources consumed) enabling text scanning on mobile telephones.

Among the first to announce mobile software capable of “reading” text using the mobile device's camera is International Wireless Inc. who in February 2003 released their “CheckPoint” and “WebPoint” applications. “CheckPoint” reads critical symbolic information on checks and is aimed at reducing losses that mobile merchants suffer from “bounced” checks by scanning the MICR number on the bottom of a check, while “WebPoint” enables the visual recognition and decoding of printed URL's, which are then opened by the device's web browser.

The first commercial release of a mobile text scanner, however, took place in December 2004 when Vodafone and Sharp began selling the 902SH mobile which was the first to feature a 2 megapixel digital camera with optical zoom. Among the device's various multimedia features was the built-in text/bar code/QR code scanner. The text scanner function could handle up to 60 alphabetical characters simultaneously. The scanned text could be then sent as an email or SMS message, added as a dictionary entry or, in the case of scanned URLs, opened via the device's web browser. All subsequent Sharp mobiles feature the text scanner functionality.

In September 2005, NEC Corporation and the Nara Institute of Science and Technology in Japan (NAIST) announced new software capable of transforming cameraphones into text scanners. The application differs substantially from similarly equipped mobile telephones in Japan (able to scan businesscards and small bits of text and use OCR to convert that to editable text or to URL addresses) by it ability to scan a whole page. The two companies, however, said they would not release the software commercially before the end of 2008.

Combining the text scanner function with machine translation technology was first made by US company RantNetwork who in July 2007 started selling the Communilator, a machine translation application for mobile devices featuring the Image Translation functionality. Using the built-in camera, the mobile user could take a picture of some printed text, apply OCR to recognize the text and then translate it into any one of over 25 language available.

In April 2008 Nokia showcased their Shoot-to-Translate application for the N73 model which is capable of taking a picture using the device's camera, extracting the text and then translating it. The application only offers Chinese to English translation, and does not handle large segments of text. Nokia said they are in the process of developing their Multiscanner product which, besides scanning text and business cards, would be able to translate between 52 languages.

Again in April 2008, Korean company Unichal Inc. released their handheld Dixau text scanner capable of scanning and recognizing English text and then translating it into Korean using online translation tools such as Wikipedia or Google Translate. The device is connected to a PC or a laptop via the USB port.

In February 2009, Bulgarian company Interlecta presented at the Mobile World Congress in Barcelona their mobile translator including image recognition and speech synthesis. The application handles all European languages along with Chinese, Japanese and Korean. The software connects to a server over the Internet to accomplish the image recognition and the translation.

In May 2014, Google acquired Word Lens to improve the quality of visual and voice translation. It is able to scan text or picture with one's device and have it translated instantly.

Since the OCR has been improving many companies or website started combining OCR and translation, to read the text from an image and show the translated text.

Currently, image translation is offered by the following companies:

- Google Translate app with camera
- ImageTranslate
- Yandex
