= ULTRA (machine translation system) =

ULTRA is a machine translation system created for five languages (Japanese, Chinese, Spanish, English, and German) in the Computing Research Laboratory in 1991.

ULTRA (Universal Language Translator), is a machine translation system developed at the Computing Research Laboratory, which can translate between five languages (Japanese, Chinese, Spanish, English and German). It uses Artificial intelligence as well as linguistic and logic programming methods. The main goal of the system is to be robust, to cover general language and to be simple to use. It uses bidirectional parsers/generators.

The system has a language-independent system of intermediate representation, which means that it takes into account needs for expression (expression is one of the main elements of language) and it uses relaxation techniques to provide the best translation. It used an X Window user interface.

== ULTRA's databases ==
- ULTRA has vocabularies based on about 10,000 word senses in each of its five languages.
- It represents expressions.
- It has an access to many dictionary databases.

== Operation ==
Users paste a sentence into the "source" window. They chose a target language and press Translate. The tool translates the source text, taking into consideration what is said, how it is said and why it is said.

Lexical entries in the system have two parts:

- Specific language entry corresponding to the graphic form, which is representing some kind of information/sense and
- Intermediate representation giving proper forms that represent the sense of the expression.

ULTRA works with Intermediate representation of the language between the systems, so no transfer takes place. Each language has its own systems, which are independent. Having the independent systems gives an extra benefit. Adding another language does not disrupt existing language translations.

=== Intermediate representation ===
Developers David Farwell and Yorick Wilks created IR (interlingual representation). It was a base for analyzing and generating expressions.

They analyzed many different types of communications (business letters, documents, emails) to compare the communication style. ULTRA looks for the best words for some kinds of information and good forms and equivalents for some expression in target language.

== External ==
- Austermuhl Frank, ″Electronic tools for translations″, Manchester 2001
- Wilks Yorick, ″Machine Translation. Its Scope and Limits.″, Springer Science+Business Media LLC 2009
- Farwell David, Wilks Yorick, "ULTRA: A multilingual machine translator", Washington 1991
