= Termbase =

Database for concept-oriented terminology

In terminology management, a termbase, or term base (a contraction of terminology and database), is a database consisting of concept-oriented terminological entries (or ‘concepts’) and related information, usually in multilingual format. Entries may include any of the following additional information:

- a definition;
- source or context of the term;
- subject area, domain, or industry;
- grammatical information (verb, noun, etc.);
- notes;
- usage label (figurative, American English, formal, etc.);
- author (‘created by’),
- creation/modification date (‘created/modified at’);
- verification status (‘verified’ or ‘approved’ terms), and
- an ID.

A termbase allows for the systematic management of approved or verified terms and is a powerful tool for promoting consistency in terminology.

== In computer science ==
In a broader sense, "term base" in computer science is used to designate any resource that provides terminology information. In addition to term bases in the terminological sense, this includes knowledge graphs and ontologies.

== See also ==
- Translation memory
- Glossary
- Dictionary
- Controlled vocabulary
- Concordance (publishing)
