= European Association for Machine Translation =

The European Association for Machine Translation is the European branch of the International Association for Machine Translation. It is a non-profit organisation and organises conferences and workshops on the subject of machine translation. It was registered in 1991 in Switzerland and is the only organisation of its type in Europe.

== Annual conferences ==
The European Association for Machine Translation holds annual conferences, and in 2026 it was hosted by the ISMT Research Group at the Tilburg University, as its 26th annual gathering. The venue was the Schouwburg Concertzaal Tilburg (nl) in Tilburg, Netherlands between the 15th and 18th June.

From among the machine translation industry professionals, practitioners, and researchers, keynote speakers at that occasion consisted of:

- Dr. Rachel Bawden, Inria Paris: on Large Language Models and machine translation for low-resource languages;
- Dr. Antonio Toral, University of Alicante: a leading voice in literary MT and human-machine translation comparison.

The technologies involved to facilitate gender-inclusive translation, as well as Artificial Intelligence to be applied for the teaching of translation, and Generative AI translation and Sykes were discussed at workshops.

== See also ==
- Asia-Africa Association for Machine Translation
- Assiciation for Machine Translation in the Americas
