= Language barrier =

Difficulty in communication experienced by speakers of different languages or dialects

A language barrier is a figurative phrase used primarily to refer to linguistic barriers to communication, i.e. the difficulties in communication experienced by people or groups originally speaking or writing different languages (or different dialects in some cases).

Language barriers impede the formation of interpersonal relationships and can cause misunderstandings leading to various kinds of serious consequences. These can include conflict, frustration, medical distress, offenses of a criminal nature, violence, and the useless expenditure of time, effort, money, and human life.

== Communication ==
Typically, little communication between speakers of different languages occurs unless one or both parties learn a new language, which requires an investment of much time and effort. People travelling abroad often encounter a language barrier.

People who come to a new country at an adult age or who have a limited vocabulary, when language learning is a cumbersome process, can have particular difficulty overcoming the language barrier. Similar difficulties occur at multinational meetings, where interpreting services can be costly, hard to obtain, and prone to error.

In 1995, 24,000 of the freshmen entering the California State University system reported English was their second language; yet only 1,000 of these non-native speakers of English tested proficient in college-level English. Numbers such as these make it evident that it is crucial for instruction librarians to acknowledge the challenges that language can present. Use of English is a key complicating factor in international students' use of an American university library.

Language difficulties affect not only information-gathering skills but also help-seeking behaviors. Lack of proficiency in English can be a major concern for international students in their library use as it relates to asking for and receiving assistance. Lee (1991), herself a former international student, explains that international students tend to be acquiescent and believe that school is the one place in the English-speaking world where they should be able to compete on an equal basis. International students are receptive and strongly motivated. For international students, concerned with proper sentence structure and precise vocabulary, this alteration of words and positions can be much more baffling than it is to native English speakers. The use of synonyms, a necessity in keyword searching, is difficult to master, especially for students with limited English vocabulary (F. Jacobson, 1988).

In 2012, the Rosetta Foundation declared April 19 international No Language Barrier Day. The idea behind the day is to raise international awareness about the fact that languages do not represent barriers: languages should not be removed as they are not a barrier – to the contrary, they should be celebrated. Rather, the foundation argues that access to translation services is the barrier preventing communities from accessing and sharing information across languages. The annual celebration of this day aims to raise awareness about and grow global community translation efforts.

Language barriers can also be a concern for those seeking healthcare as patient–physician communication can be compromised. Patients unable to understand or communicate their concerns with their doctors often experience decreased quality in healthcare. These differences can be overcome via methods such as translation services or language classes for physicians (Rand, 1998). Patient-caregiver language barriers can not only be a consequences of the patients not being native in the language of the country, but also result from migration of the workforce: For instance, nurses in Germany name insufficient language proficiency as a key barrier to the workplace integration of international colleagues. Specific language training is considered an enabling factor, such as active speaking training in job-specific scenarios with virtual patients.

== Migration ==
Language barriers also influence migration. Emigrants are far more likely to move to a destination country which speaks the same language as the emigrant's country. Thus, most British emigration has been to Australia, Canada, the United States, or New Zealand, most Spanish emigration has been to Latin America, and Portuguese emigration to Brazil. Even if the destination country does not speak the emigrant's language, it is still more likely to receive immigration if it speaks a language related to that of the emigrant.

The most obvious example is the great migration of Europeans to the Americas. The United States, with its dominant Germanic English language, attracted primarily immigrants from Northern Europe, where Germanic languages were spoken or familiar. The most common ethnic backgrounds in the United States are German, Irish, and English, and the vast majority of Scandinavian emigrants also moved to the United States (or English-speaking Canada).

Southern Europeans, such as Italians, were more likely to move to Latin American countries; today, people of Italian descent are the second-largest ethnic background in Argentina, Uruguay, and Brazil, after Spanish and (in Brazil) Portuguese, but rank fourth in the United States among European groups.

In the past decade, Romanians have primarily chosen Italy and Spain as emigration destinations, with Germany, the largest Western European country, ranking a distant third.

== Language dominance after colonisation ==
Nigeria was a British colony and was forced to use English. Nigerians spoke English rather than their own languages, and the use of English has rapidly spread throughout Nigerian society. The role of English in education is important, and English dominates the printed media. Although informal education in Nigeria uses Nigerian languages, most Nigerians are more literate in English.

When the British government took over the administration of the schools in Nigeria, they came up with a policy that made English language a core subject in schools. After independence, the Nigerian educational system remained the same. English is the language of instruction in Nigeria from primary through secondary to tertiary education. It is the language in which all other subjects in the educational curriculum are taught. A credit pass in English is a compulsory condition for securing admission into Nigerian tertiary institutions.

It is also exemplified throughout other British Commonwealth or formerly colonised countries. Other examples besides English include Portuguese in Angola and French in Mauritius.

== Education ==
=== United States ===
An increasing number of students prefer to study abroad. Along other challenges of international travel, language barriers have become one of the greatest problems for international students, especially in the United States. Much research exists that shows the difficulties imposed by language barriers for these students, including helplessness and excess stress. Selvadurai mentioned the issue of language barriers, the dentification of classroom atmosphere, and faculty-student relationship difficulties for international students in his research, which was published in 1998. Of all the factors, he said that language is "the first barrier encountered by international students" (154).

According to Chen, counseling instructor at the University of British Columbia, not only will a language barrier cause anxiety for international students—second language anxiety, educational stressors, and sociocultural stressors were also identified by Chen as the three biggest challenges for international students (51–56). In addition, students are also likely to experience social isolation, prejudice, and discrimination: "Foreign students rank negative attitudes and a lack of cultural sensitivity among US nationals as the greatest perceived barriers to successful intergroup relations."

These students often face prejudice, isolation and discrimination because of the lack of second language proficiency, which in turn causes psychological problems within these individuals. International students cite experiencing negative issues such as "awkwardness, anxiousness, uneasiness, self-consciousness, defensiveness, suspicion, hostility, and superiority", as well as positive outcomes such as "admiration, respectfulness, happiness, comfortableness, confidence, interest, curiosity and inspiration."

Some advice has been discussed by scholars to help international students ease into socially different environments. To alleviate the stress that these students experience, some scholars have suggested dealing with the problems with a positive attitude, while also advising the students to reach out for problem-solving resources, especially during their orientation period (Olivas and Li 219–220). As professor S. G. Nelson said in 1991 in his book, How Language is Life, "Language is much more than a vocabulary of words. Language is how people express their feelings and show their individuality, and when different age groups are together, people of all ages must learn how to act around other groups."

Language barriers can also affect young English language learners in U.S. schools. When evaluating the educational needs of English language learners, schools face difficulties because their academic troubles may possibly have more than one cause. Deciding whether a student needs language support, help for a learning disability, or a mix of both may call for a careful evaluation. This process can become complicated when school districts have limited access to training, qualified staff, and evaluation tools. As a result, schools may run into challenges when attempting to determine which educational services and support are best for English language learners.

=== Kenya ===
Foreign languages have been part of Kenyan universities for a long time. Languages such as German, French, Portuguese, Arabic, Japanese, and Chinese are learnt in college and university settings by Kenyan students. The University of Nairobi has created a sub-department of French, indicating the significance of French at the university. Students who take French as a university course start learning the language while they are in secondary school. Due to insufficient numbers of lecturers teaching French in Kenyan universities, students have to rely on part-time lecturers of French for the smooth running of their courses. Issues facing French as a course in Kenyan universities also include insufficient learning materials, course content, scholarships, as well as job opportunities for lecturers and graduates of French in Kenya.

The majority of Kenyan students in primary schools are beginner-level English language users, which leads to not having the required language skills needed to learn the subject content effectively in English. Teachers encounter challenges such as diverse student backgrounds, native language interference, lack of usefulness of English language in the community, students' attitudes toward English, and insufficient learning resources.

An education project in Kenya known as Tasfiri is being implemented in the Kukuma refugee camp to improve learning outcomes for learners who do not understand English or Swahili. The project was developed to assist primary refugee learners in learning their native language.

=== Nigerian ===
Challenges facing Nigerian teachers in improving English-language learning outcomes include current trends in the teaching of a second language, lack of resources for English-language teaching, inadequate knowledge of English, and attitudes towards the language on the part of the students. Most Nigerian textbooks used in the educational system are written in English. Mass failure is a result of inadequate learning outcomes in English from primary school.

== Auxiliary languages as a solution ==
Since the late 1800s, auxiliary languages have been available to help overcome language barriers. They were traditionally written or constructed by a person or group. Originally, the idea was that two people who wanted to communicate could learn an auxiliary language with little difficulty and could use this language to speak or write to each other.

In the first half of the twentieth century, a second approach to auxiliary languages emerged: that there was no need to construct an auxiliary language, because the most widely spoken languages already had many words in common. These words could be developed into a simple language. People in many countries would understand this language when they read or heard it, because its words also occurred in their own languages. This approach addressed a perceived limitation of the available auxiliary languages: the need to convince others to learn them before communication could take place. The newer auxiliary languages could also be used to learn ethnic languages quickly and to better understand one's own language.

Examples of traditional auxiliary languages, sometimes called schematic languages, are Esperanto, Ido, and Volapük. Examples of the newer approach, sometimes called naturalistic languages, are Interlingua, Interlingue and Latino sine flexione. Only Esperanto and Interlingua are widely used today, although Ido is also in use.

The second approach is pushed even further by the so-called zonal languages, languages intended specifically for speakers of closely related languages. Since languages of the same family already have a certain degree of mutual intelligibility, the idea is that receptive bilingualism should allow a language based on their commonalities to be understandable without any prior learning. The most widely used example is Interslavic.

== Other uses of term ==
- SIL Global discusses "language as a major barrier to literacy" if a speaker's language is unwritten.
- In Hinduism, the language barrier represents the shortcomings of words to communicate profound meaning and spiritual experiences.

== Misconceptions ==
It is sometimes assumed that when multiple languages exist in a setting, there must therefore be multiple language barriers. Multilingual societies generally have lingua francas and traditions of its members learning more than one language, an adaptation; while not entirely removing barriers of understanding, it belies the notion of impassable language barriers.

For example, there are an estimated 250 different languages spoken in London alone, but members of every ethnic group on average manage to assimilate into British society and be productive members of it.

== Consequences ==
Language barriers can affect access to healthcare. For example, a study showed that British-Pakistani women who faced cultural and language barriers were less likely to attend breast screening because they were not aware that it takes place in a female-only environment.

== See also ==
- Language acquisition
- Multilingualism
- International auxiliary language
