= Postediting =

Translation process after machine-generation

Post-editing (or postediting) is the process whereby humans amend machine-generated translation to achieve an acceptable final product. A person who post-edits is called a post-editor. The concept of post-editing is linked to that of pre-editing. In the process of translating a text via machine translation, best results may be gained by pre-editing the source text – for example by applying the principles of controlled language – and then post-editing the machine output. It is distinct from editing, which refers to the process of improving human generated text (a process which is often known as revision in the field of translation). Post-edited text may afterwards be revised to ensure the quality of the language choices are proofread to correct simple mistakes.

Post-editing involves the correction of machine translation output to ensure that it meets a level of quality negotiated in advance between the client and the post-editor. Light post-editing aims at making the output simply understandable; full post-editing at making it also stylistically appropriate. With advances in machine translation full post-editing is becoming an alternative to manual translation. Practically all computer-assisted translation (CAT) tools now support post-editing of machine translated output.

== Post-editing and machine translation ==
Machine translation left the labs to start being used for its actual purpose in the late seventies at some big institutions such as the European Commission and the Pan-American Health Organization, and then, later, at some corporations such as Caterpillar and General Motors. First studies on post-editing appeared in the eighties, linked to those implementations. To develop appropriate guidelines and training, members of the Association for Machine Translation in the Americas (AMTA) and the European Association for Machine Translation (EAMT) set a Post-editing Special Interest Group in 1999.

After the nineties, advances in computer power and connectivity sped machine translation development and allowed for its deployment through the web browser, including as a free, useful adjunct to the main search engines (Google Translate, Bing Translator, Yahoo! Babel Fish). A wider acceptance of less than perfect machine translation was accompanied also by a wider acceptance of post-editing. With the demand for localisation of goods and services growing at a pace that could not be met by human translation, not even assisted by translation memory and other translation management technologies, industry bodies such as the Translation Automation Users Society (TAUS) expect machine translation and post-editing to play a much bigger role within the next few years.

The use of Machine Translation suggests sometimes pre-editing.

Human translators possess significantly more sophisticated cognitive abilities than machine translation (MT) systems. They leverage a wealth of life experience, common sense, and multi-sensory input to understand context, identify semantic intent, and add cultural nuances to translations. This remains true even as MT capabilities continue to improve.

Unlike MT systems, which primarily focus on literal word-for-word conversion, human translators grasp the underlying meaning and intent, even when information is implicit. They "read between the lines," guided by their understanding of the world. Essentially, MT models excel at text string prediction, not true comprehension. Their success often stems from framing problems as prediction tasks, such as in self-driving cars or fraud detection.

Studies have demonstrated that integrating adaptive MT with post-editing interfaces can lead to reductions in technical effort and time, improving overall translation efficiency. These systems are also supported by research that highlights the benefits of adaptive MT in real-world translation scenarios. For example, incremental adaptation in Neural Machine Translation (NMT) for professional post-editors has been shown to improve translation quality and reduce time spent on edits, showcasing how human expertise and machine assistance can complement each other effectively.

== Light and full post-editing ==
For many years, no widely accepted, standardized post-editing guidelines existed; however, in 2017, ISO standard 18587:2017: Translation services — Post-editing of machine translation output — Requirements was published. Studies in the eighties distinguished between degrees of post-editing which, in the context of the European Commission Translation Service, were first defined as conventional and rapid or full and rapid. Light and full post-editing seems the wording most used today.

Light post-editing implies minimal intervention by the post-editor, with the aim of ensuring quality is "good enough" or "understandable"; the expectation is that the client will use it for inbound purposes only, often when the text is needed urgently, or has a short time span.

Full post-editing involves a greater level of intervention to achieve a degree of quality to be negotiated between client and post-editor; the expectation is that the outcome will be a text that is not only understandable but presented in some stylistically appropriate way, so it can be used for assimilation and even for dissemination, for inbound and for outbound purposes. The quality is expected to be publishable and equivalent to that of a human translation.

The assumption, however, has been that it takes less effort for translators to work directly from the source text than to post-edit the machine generated version. With advances in machine translation, this may be changing. For some language pairs and for some tasks, and with engines that have been customised with domain specific good quality data, some clients are already requesting translators to post-edit instead of translating from scratch, in the belief that they will attain similar quality at a lower cost.

The light/full classification, developed in the nineties when machine translation still came on a CD-ROM, may not suit advances in machine translation at the light post-editing end either. For some language pairs and some tasks, particularly if the source has been pre-edited, raw machine output may be good enough for gisting purposes without requiring subsequent human intervention.

== Post-editing efficiency ==
Post-editing is used when raw machine translation is not good enough and human translation not required. Industry advises post-editing to be used when it can at least double the productivity of manual translation, even fourfold it in the case of light post-editing (1000 words per hour vs. 250 wph).

However, post-editing efficiency is difficult to predict. Various studies from both academia and industry have claimed that post-editing is generally faster than translating from scratch, regardless of language pairs or translators' experience. There is, however, no agreement about how much time can be saved through post-editing in practice (if any at all): While the industry reports on time savings around 40%, some academic studies suggest that time savings under actual working conditions are more likely to be between 0–20%, or that it may depend on the terminological proximity between the source and target languages. Professionals have also reported negative productivity gains where corrections require more time than to translate from scratch.

== Post-editing and the language industry ==
After some thirty years, post-editing is still "a nascent profession". What the right profile of the post-editor is, has not yet been fully studied. Post-editing overlaps with translating and editing, but only partially. Most think the ideal post-editor will be a translator keen to be trained on the specific skills required, but there are some who think a bilingual without a background in translation may be easier to train. Not much is known either on who the actual post-editors are, whether they tend to be professional translators, whether they work mostly as in-house employees or self-employed, and on which conditions. Many professional translators dislike post-editing, among other reasons because it tends to be paid at lower rates than conventional translations, with the International Association of Professional Translators and Interpreters (IAPTI) having been particularly vocal about it.

== See also ==
- Machine translation
- Controlled language
- Translation memory
- Editing
- Proofreading
- Computer-assisted translation
- Pre-editing
