= RWS Group =

British company

- Type: plc
- Industry: Patent and commercial translations, localisation, interpreting, patent searches, patent database, translation memory and machine translation technology
- Founded: 1958 (as M.H. Randall & Partners)
- Headquarters: Maidenhead, Berkshire, United Kingdom
- Key people: Andrew Brode, Chairman; Benjamin Faes, CEO
- Revenue: £690.1m (2025)
- Number of employees: 7,649 (2025)
- Parent: RWS Holdings plc.
- Subsidiaries: Eclipse Translations; Corporate Translations; Luz; Pharma Quest; RWS Group Deutschland; RWS Group Switzerland; Inovia; Moravia IT; Iconic Translation Machines; Webdunia.com India; SDL
- Website: www.rws.com

RWS Group, known commercially as RWS, is a British multinational AI solutions company. It provides intellectual property translation, filing and search services, technical and commercial translation and localisation, and develops and supports translation productivity and management software.

== History ==
The company was created in 1982 from a merger between M.H. Randall & Partners (a specialist translation company) and Woolcott & Co (a specialist patent and technical information searching company). In 2005 it acquired Eclipse Translations, a company formed in December 1996. In 2015 it acquired Corporate Translations Inc. (CTi), a Connecticut-based life sciences translation and linguistic validation provider for a $70 million in cash. Then in 2017, the company acquired Luz, Inc., a US-based life sciences language services provider for $82.5 million: the company raised £40 million of the consideration by issuing 12.1m ordinary shares with the rest funded by a $26.3 million banking facility from Barclays.

In 2017, RWS purchased Czech-based localization provider Moravia IT for $320 million, more than doubling the size of the group.

On 4 November 2020, RWS completed an all-share combination with major competitor SDL, creating the world's largest technology and language services provider. The transaction was valued at approximately £854 million.

== Locations ==
RWS Group headquarters are in Maidenhead, Berkshire, United Kingdom. The group has offices in Argentina, Australia, Belgium, Brazil, Canada, Chile, China, Colombia, Croatia, Czech Republic, Finland, France, Germany, India, Ireland, Japan, Netherlands, Norway, Poland, Portugal, Romania, Russia, South Africa, South Korea, Spain, Switzerland, and the United States.

=== Subsidiary companies ===
- Eclipse Translations, based in Alnwick, Northumberland, United Kingdom.
- Corporate Translations Inc., based in East Hartford, Connecticut, United States.
- Luz Inc., based in San Francisco, California, United States.
- Pharma Quest, based in Banbury, Oxfordshire, United Kingdom.
- RWS Group Deutschland GmbH., based in Berlin, Germany.
- RWS Group Switzerland LLC., based in Basel, Switzerland.
- Inovia, based in New York City, United States.
- Moravia IT s.r.o., based in Brno, Czech Republic. Rebranded to RWS Moravia on October 1, 2018.
- Iconic Translation Machines Ltd., based in Dublin, Ireland.
- Webdunia.com India Pvt. Ltd., based in Indore, India. Rebranded to RWS Moravia India in October 2020.
- SDL plc., based in Maidenhead, Berkshire, United Kingdom.
