= Trados Studio =

Translation software suite

- Developer: RWS Group
- Stable release: Trados Studio 2024 / June 2024
- Operating system: Windows
- Type: Computer-assisted translation
- License: Commercial
- Website: https://www.trados.com/

Trados Studio is a computer-assisted translation software tool for translation tasks such as editing, reviewing, and project management, including AI translation. It is owned and developed by RWS Group, a British translation software company.

== History ==
Trados Studio is the successor to Translator's Workbench, a software tool originally developed by the German company Trados GmbH. Trados GmbH was founded as a language-service provider (LSP) in 1984 by Jochen Hummel and Iko Knyphausen in Stuttgart, Germany. The company began developing translation software in the late 1980s, and released the first Microsoft Windows versions of two of the suite's major components in the early 1990s – MultiTerm in 1992, and Translator's Workbench in 1994.

Translator's Workbench was renamed to SDL Trados in 2005 when its developer was acquired by SDL plc. The software's name was reverted to Trados Studio after SDL merged with RWS on November 4, 2020.

== Configuration ==
The main desktop-based application – Trados Studio – is designed for editing and reviewing translations, managing projects, organizing terminology, and integrating with machine translation. The 2022 edition could operate both locally and via the RWS Language Cloud. The application could also be accessed via web browser.

Trados Studio can be supplemented with applications from the proprietary RWS AppStore. Application management is implemented within the Trados Studio software. MultiTerm, a terminology management tool for adding, editing and managing terms, is integrated with Trados Studio, although it is also sold as a standalone licensed product.

=== Source document formats ===
Trados Studio supports a range of file formats, including markup and tagged formats such as ML, XML, HTML, XLIFF, SDLXLIFF (Studio's native format for translation), OpenDocument files; text files; source code files, such as Java and Microsoft .NET; Microsoft Word, Excel, PowerPoint; and some Adobe file formats, such as PDF, scanned PDF (with OCR support), FrameMaker, InDesign, and InCopy. Support for other file types such as Multilingual Excel and Multilingual XML can be enabled with use of apps from the RWS AppStore.

=== Translation memories and glossaries ===
The translation memory (TM) format of Trados Studio is .sdltm, which consists in a particular SQLite database.

When creating a new (file-based) translation memory, Trados Studio creates a database file in which all translation units are stored. The translation memory also stores structural and context information to link different segments and their position in a document, which enables the tool to select translation memory segments according to relevance.

Trados Studio is compatible with server-based translation memories by connecting to Trados GroupShare, or cloud-based translation memories from Trados Team or Trados Enterprise.

Glossaries are handled by the MultiTerm application. Glossaries can be bilingual or multi-lingual, file-based or server based.

=== Machine translation and post-editing ===
Trados Studio supports machine translation and post-editing, and can insert a machine translation of a translation unit (TU) if no match is found in the translation memory. The translator can then post-edit the machine translation. Trados Studio also supports Language Weaver and many third-party machine translation providers, through apps available on the RWS AppStore, as well as the integration of other MT providers, through its open API.

== Interoperability ==
Trados Studio can open standard file formats, including XLIFF (1.2 and 2.0), TMX, TBX and OLIF. It natively supports file types from other computer-assisted translation tools such as memoQ, XLIFF, Memsource XLIFF and PO documents from GNU gettext. Support for other formats is possible using AppStore applications.

All Trados products have public APIs, which allows for user-created and third-party applications.
