= Translation management system =

Type of software

A translation management system (TMS), formerly globalization management system (GMS), is a type of software for automating many parts of the human language translation process and maximizing translator efficiency. The idea of a translation management system is to automate all repeatable and non-essential work that can be done by software/systems and leaving only the creative work of translation and review to be done by human beings. A translation management system generally includes at least two types of technology: process management technology to automate the flow of work, and linguistic technology to aid the translator.

In a typical TMS, process management technology is used to monitor source language content for changes and route the content to various translators and reviewers. These translators and reviewers may be located across the globe and typically access the TMS via the Internet.

Translation management systems are most commonly used today for managing various aspects translation business.

== History and evolution ==
TMSs evolved from earlier computer-assisted translation (CAT) tools developed in the late 20th century. These tools introduced features such as translation memory, terminology databases and quality assurance mechanisms to support human translators and efficiency in translation workflows.

Initially, CAT tools were standalone desktop applications, but their functionality expanded as information technology advanced. By the late 1990s and 2000s, they evolved into server-based and collaborative environments, enabling multiple participants to work within shared translation workflows.

This technological progression led to the emergence of more integrated systems combining linguistic tools with workflow and project management capabilities, forming the basis for modern translation management systems. As translation demand increased globally, these systems became essential for coordinating complex, multilingual projects across distributed teams.

In the 2010s and 2020s, further advances in machine translation—particularly neural machine translation (NMT)—along with cloud based architectures and AI-driven features, contributed to increased automation and scalability in translation workflows. These developments have continued to reshape the role of TMS platforms in managing multilingual content and supporting human translators.

== Naming ==
Although translation management systems (TMS) seems to be the currently favoured term in the language localisation industry, these solutions are also known as globalization management systems (GMS) or global content management systems (GCMS). They work with content management systems (CMS) as separate, but linked programs or as simple add-ons that can answer specific multilingual requirements.

== Overview ==
A TMS typically connects to a CMS to manage foreign language content. It tends to address the following categories in different degrees, depending on each offering:

- Business administration: project management, resource management, financial management. This category is traditionally related to enterprise resource planning (ERP) tools.
- Business process management: workflow, collaboration, content connectors. This category is traditionally the domain of specialised project management tools.
- Language management: integrated translation memory, webtop translation tools, customer review and markup. This is traditionally performed with specialised translation tools.

CMS excels at process management while ignoring business management and translation tools, which are strongholds of TMS.

== Features and benefits ==
A typical TMS workflow goes through the following steps:

Change detection of updated or new materials is a must either with standard off-the-shelf CMSs or with the use of custom-developed connectors in the case of proprietary systems. Content is automatically extracted from the CMS and packaged for transmission to the TMS. In some cases, file manipulation may be needed for later analysis and translation. Project managers customise workflows to match their business needs. Every participant in the workflow receives a notification where there is new work to be done, and a unique number is assigned to every project and every task for traceability. Translators and revisers work either online or offline and their queries and comments are tracked through the system. Translators or revisers receive comments from the customer's in-country reviewers to verify and implement any corrections. After the documents are approved, the TMS is automatically updated for later reuse. Finally, the translated materials are returned into their CMS for publishing and productivity and efficiency metrics are available through reports.

Linguistic technology generally includes at least translation memory and terminology database; some systems also integrate machine translation technology. Translation memory is a database of all previously translated sentences. While a translator performs translation, he or she is automatically prompted with similar sentences from the memory that were previously translated. A terminology database is a glossary that contains specific words and phrases and their context-appropriate translations.

A machine translation system is a program that uses natural language processing technology to automatically translate a text from one language to another.

== Future ==
Future trends in TMSs include:

- interoperation with more CMS offerings: content managers should be able to order translations within their own environment
- tie in with text authoring environments: for existing multilingual content leverage against new writing
- incorporation of business management functions: to preview the localization cost and timeframe
- integration with enterprise systems: general ledger applications and sales force automation tools

== Target markets and licensing ==
TMS providers typically market their products to two main types of buyers. Some vendors focus on software-only offerings, targeting content producers and providing the platform without additional language services. Others offer an integrated solution in which the software is paired with the vendor's own language services, facilitating easier customer integration. The latter is commonly referred to as a “captive solution”, as buyers must use the language services of the TMS developer in order to take advantage of their platform.

Content producers with existing contracts or preferred third-party Language Service Provider(LSP)s may choose to license the software independently. Similarly, some LSPs may prefer to work with technology vendors that do not directly compete with them in providing language services.

== See also ==
- Content management system
- Computer-assisted translation
- Internationalization and localization
