= Virtaal =

Free and open-source computer-assisted translation tool

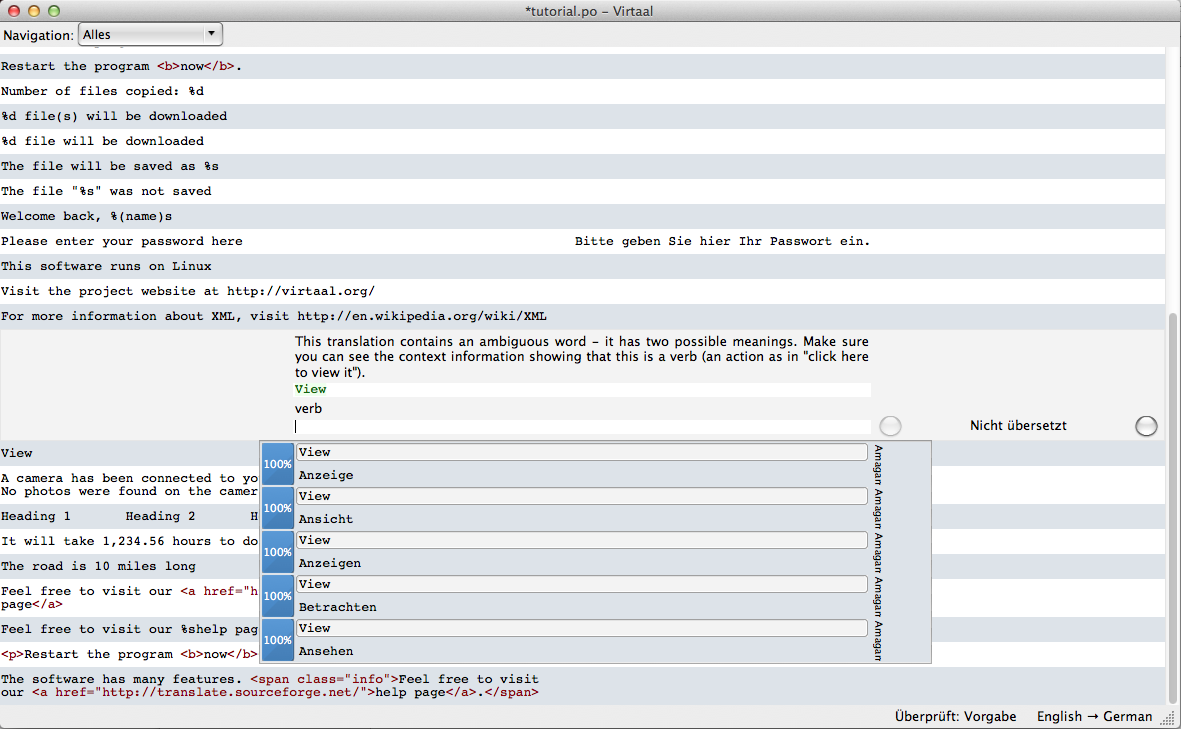
- Original author: Translate.org.za
- Release: 2007
- Stable release: 0.7.1 / 10 January 2012; 14 years ago
- Operating system: Cross-platform
- Type: Computer-assisted translation
- License: GPL
- Website: virtaal.translatehouse.org

Virtaal (Afrikaans pronunciation: [fərˈtɑːl]) is a computer-assisted translation tool written in the Python programming language. It is free software developed and maintained by Translate.org.za.

Virtaal is built using the Translate Toolkit allowing it to process a number of translation and localisation formats.

== Name ==
The name Virtaal is a play on words. In Afrikaans, an official language of South Africa where Translate.org.za is located, the expression vir taal means "for language", while the word vertaal (pronounced the same) means "translate".

== Design Philosophy ==
The key principle behind the design of Virtaal is the optimisation of the interface for the localiser. This includes ensuring that all relevant functionality is keyboard accessible and that needed information is always optimally displayed.

== History ==
Work on Virtaal began in 2007 with an initial 0.1 release made to a small number of open-source localisers. Version 0.2, released in October 2008, became the first official release.

Development stalled between 2020 and 2026.

== Supported source document formats ==
Virtaal works directly with any of the bilingual (containing both source and target language) files understood by the Translate Toolkit. This would include XLIFF, Gettext PO and MO, various Qt files (.qm, .ts, .qph), Wordfast translation memory, TBX, TMX and OmegaT glossaries.

== Features ==
- Simple single view interface
- Colour highlighting
- Autocorrect
- Autocomplete
- In-context segment filtering:
  - All segments
  - Partial translations and non-translated segments
  - All segments matching a search string (includes case-sensitivity and Python regular expressions)
- Search and replace with regular expressions and Unicode normalisation
- Translation memory with several back-ends:
  - Local translation memory database (including current file)
  - Remote translation memory database (such as an office TM server)
  - Open-Tran.eu
  - Machine translation through Apertium, Google Translate, Microsoft Translator, Moses or the libtranslate library providing access to several others
  - TinyTM
- Terminology help from:
  - Automatically downloaded files
  - Local terminology files
  - Open-Tran.eu
- Recognition and easy insertion of placeables
- Language identification
- Quality checks

== See also ==
- Computer-assisted Translation
- Pootle
- OmegaT
