= Crowdin =

Localization technology company

- Type: Private
- Industry: Translation and localization
- Founded: 2009; 17 years ago
- Founder: Serhiy Dmytryshyn
- Headquarters: Tallinn, Estonia; 59.429868°N 24.759318°E
- Website: crowdin.com

Crowdin is a proprietary, cloud-based localization technology and services company. It provides software as a service for commercial products, and it provides software free of charge for non-commercial open source projects, and educational projects.

== History ==
The company was founded in 2009 by Ukrainian programmer Serhiy Dmytryshyn as a hobby project for localization of small projects. The platform was officially launched in January 2009. Since then, it was adopted among software and game development (including Minecraft) companies, for software translation. The suite includes an automated machine translation engine and a translation memory to store and reuse translations.

== Translation mechanics ==
The tool has an Online Translation Editor, where texts can be translated and proofread by linguists. Translation strategies include in-house translation team, crowdsourcing, and translation agency. Crowdin has a marketplace with translation agencies: Inlingo, Alconost, Applingua, Babble-on, Gengo, Tomedes, Translated, Translate by Humans, WritePath, Farsi Translation Services, Bureau Translations, e2f, Web-lingo, Leanlane, and Acclaro.

Crowdin has integrated machine translation into the translation workflow. It currently supports the following MT systems: Microsoft Translator, Google Translate, Amazon Translate, Watson (IBM) Translator, DeepL Translator. Machine translations can be post-edited.

== See also ==
- Trados Studio
- MemoQ
- Gridly
- Phrase
- Lokalise
- Poedit
- Pootle
- Transifex
- Weblate
- Translatewiki.net
