= Transifex =

Translation management system

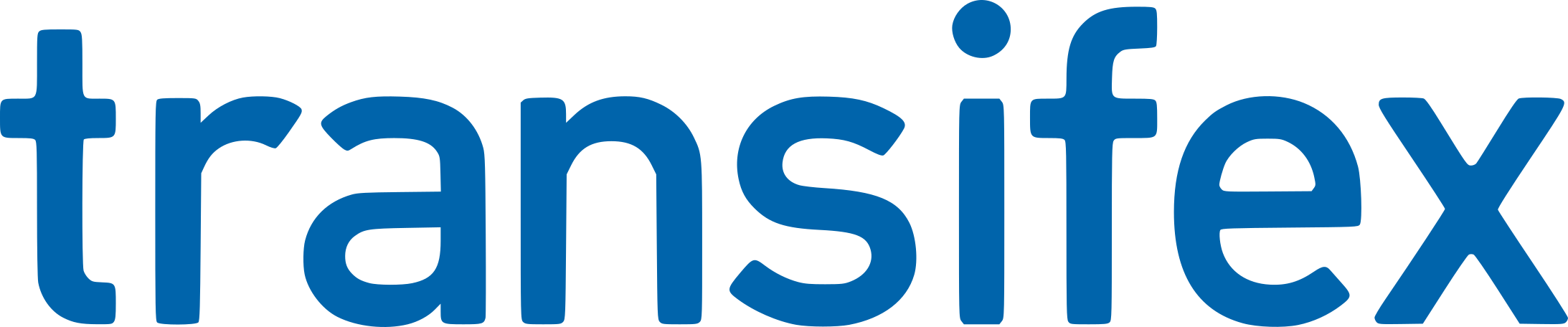
- Website type: Localization management and crowdsourcing
- Available in: English and 15 more
- Owners: Transifex, Inc.
- Creator: Dimitris Glezos
- Website: www.transifex.com
- Commercial: Yes
- Registration: Required
- Launched: June 2009; 17 years ago
- Current status: online

Transifex (previously known as Indifex) is a globalization management system (GMS), a proprietary software, and a web-based translation platform. It targets technical projects with frequently updated content, such as software, documentation, and websites, and encourages the automation of the localization workflow by integrating with common developer tools.

Transifex is an SaaS (software as a Service), with paid and free plan for localizing open-source software. Transifex was originally an open-source project but was discontinued in 2013.

The site provides a hosting platform for translation files and social networking functions, such as feeds, discussion boards, translation suggestions, and voting to allow translators to collaborate. Transifex is written using Django and Python by founder Dimitris Glezos under a Google Summer of Code project.

== History ==
Transifex, which started as a Google Summer of Code project to solve a Fedora Project problem, has evolved into a complete movement backed by a new startup business, Transifex. The creator of Transifex, Dimitris Glezos, has worked since 2007 to create the Transifex vision of localization and i18n tools. As of March 2014, transifex.com has over 17,000 project translations hosted across 150 languages, including Creative Commons, Coursera, Django and Django-cms, Dolibarr, Eventbrite, Mercurial, Bitbucket, GlobaLeaks, TalentLMS, MeeGo, OpenStack, Pinterest, qBittorrent, Reddit, Xfce, Wheelmap.org, VLC, and others.

The company was formerly located in Greece but is now headquartered in Silicon Valley.

In 2025, Transifex was bought by XTM International.

== Workflow description ==
A project owner creates a project in Transifex. The person creates a translation team or appoints maintainers to create the teams instead of them. The project owner or maintainer then uploads the translatable content to Transifex. Then, the translation teams begin the translation process. Once the content is translated, the project owner can download it manually or pull it using the Transifex command-line tool.

=== Supported document formats ===
Transifex supports Android, Apple Resources, ASP, .desktop files, Gettext (PO/POT) files, Microsoft.NET, code files (C, Java, PHP, Qt), Joomla INI files, Mozilla DTD, Plain text, Subtitles, Web pages, XLIFF files, XML files, YAML, and more.

=== Notable features ===
- Many supported file formats.
- Ability to download content, translate it offline, and then upload it.
- An Online Editor called Live for translating resources online.
- Command Line Client that allows uploading, downloading, and updating translation resources.
- Translation Memory that reduces the effort when having to translate something already translated somewhere else.
- Tools for monitoring activity and getting real time overviews of the status of a project.
- Messaging and notification system for keeping a translation team informed.
- API for integration with other platforms/services.
- Ability to re-use the same translation teams when managing multiple projects and manage them from one master project.
- Term glossary that works with an upvote/downvote fashion.
- Framework-specific SDKs that follow a universal localization syntax (Android, iOS, JavaScript/React, Django, Python).

== See also ==
- Lokalise
- Gridly
- Phrase
- Crowdin
- Pootle
- translatewiki.net
- Weblate
