= Poedit =

Software for computer-assisted translation

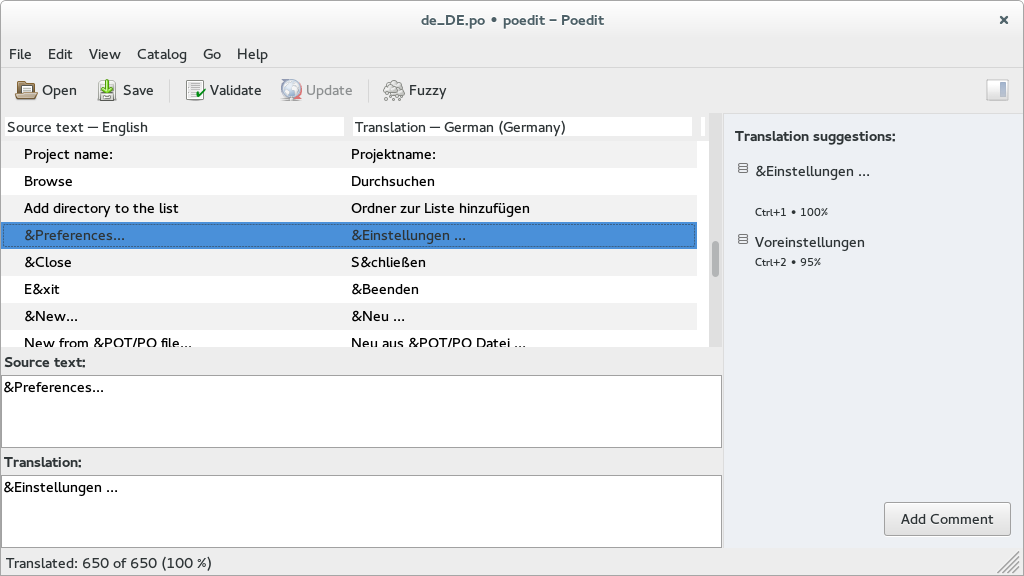
- Developer: Václav Slavík
- Release: 2001; 25 years ago
- Stable release: 3.9.1 / 4 June 2026; 3 months ago
- Written in: C++
- Operating system: Windows, macOS, Unix-like
- Platform: Cross-platform
- Available in: Multilingual
- Type: Computer-assisted translation
- License: Basic version: MIT License; Pro version: Shareware - Windows, macOS
- Website: poedit.com
- Repository: github.com/vslavik/poedit

Poedit (formerly poEdit) is a shareware and cross-platform gettext catalog (.po file) editor to aid in the process of language localisation. According to WordPress developer Thord Hedengren, Poedit is "one of the most popular programs" for editing portable language files.

It is written in C++ and depends on some subclasses from the wxWidgets, but utilizes graphical control elements from the GTK library.

Besides Gettext catalogs, Poedit supports XLIFF, JSON, Qt and Flutter localization files. It also supports offline editing and synchronization of projects hosted on Crowdin and Localazy.

== See also ==
- Lokalise
- Phrase
- Transifex
