= Pottle =

Pottle may refer to:

== Surname ==
- Bill Pottle (born 1978), American author of books on fantasy, martial arts, and Christianity
- Emory B. Pottle (1815–1891), U.S. Representative from New York
- Gilbert Emery Bensley Pottle (1875–1945), American actor who appeared in over 80 movies
- Herbert Pottle (1907–2002), Canadian politician, civil servant, magistrate and writer
- Pat Pottle (1938–2000), founding member of the Committee of 100, an anti-nuclear direct action group
- Patty Pottle, Canadian politician in Newfoundland and Labrador
- Sam Pottle (1934–1978), American composer, conductor, and musical director

== Places ==
- Pottle Bay, a natural bay on the coast of Labrador in the province of Newfoundland and Labrador, Canada
- Pottle, Annagelliff, a townland of County Cavan, Ireland

== Other uses ==
- Pottle (unit), a unit of volume, equal to two quarts or half a gallon
- Pottle, an old form of the name of the River Poddle, Dublin, Ireland

== See also ==
- Bottle (disambiguation)
- Patle
- Pootle
