= Swordfish Translation Editor =

- Stable release: 5.26.0 / July 25, 2026; 3 days ago
- Type: Computer-assisted translation
- License: Open Source (Eclipse Public License)
- Website: maxprograms.com

Swordfish Translation Editor is a Computer-assisted translation software.

== Features ==
It works with the XLIFF standard, after having extracted texts from a variety of file format. It stores translation memory in an internal database and can export it in the standard TMX format; import is also possible. A server, RemoteTM, can be used instead of the internal database if sharing is needed.

It supports the following localization industry standards:

- Unicode
- XLIFF (XML Localisation Interchange File Format)
- TMX (Translation Memory eXchange)
- SRX (Segmentation Rules eXchange)
- PO (Portable Object)
- TBX (TermBase eXchange)
- GlossML (Glossary Markup Language)

Supported File Formats

OpenXLIFF Filters can generate XLIFF 1.2, 2.0, 2.1 and 2.2 from these formats:

- General Documentation

 - Adobe InCopy ICML
 - Adobe InDesign Interchange (INX)
 - Adobe InDesign IDML CS4, CS5, CS6 & CC
 - HTML
 - Microsoft Office (2007 and newer)
 - Microsoft Visio XML Drawings (2007 and newer)
 - MIF (Maker Interchange Format)
 - OpenOffice / LibreOffice / StarOffice
 - PHP Arrays
 - Plain Text
 - QTI (IMS Question and Test Interoperability)
 - QTI Packages
 - SDLXLIFF (Trados Studio)
 - SRT Subtitles
 - Trados Studio Packages (*.sdlppx)
 - TXML (GlobalLink/Wordfast PRO)
 - VTT Subtitles (WebVTT)
 - WPML XLIFF (WordPress Multilingual Plugin)
 - Wordfast/GlobalLink XLIFF (*.txlf)
 - XLIFF from Other Tools (.mqxliff, .txlf, .xliff, etc.)

- XML Formats

 - XML (Generic)
 - DITA 1.0, 1.1, 1.2 and 1.3
 - DocBook 3.x, 4.x and 5.x
 - SVG
 - Word 2003 ML
 - XHTML

- Software Development

 - JavaScript
 - JSON
 - Java Properties
 - PHP Arrays
 - PO (Portable Objects)
 - RC (Windows C/C++ Resources)
 - ResX (Windows .NET Resources)
 - TS (Qt Linguist translation source)

Open API: Yes Has a command line interface for using main features in batch mode.

Source: TAUS Tracker, http://www.taustracker.com/54/92-swordfish-translation-editor

== See also ==
- Translation memory
- Computer-assisted Translation
- DeepL
- vidby
