= Lokalise =

Software-localization tool

- Type: Private
- Industry: Translation and localization
- Founded: 2017; 9 years ago in Riga, Latvia
- Founders: Nick Ustinov and Petr Antropov
- Headquarters: Fully remote
- Key people: Sophie Krishnan (CEO)
- Number of employees: 250+ (2022)
- Website: lokalise.com

Lokalise is a localization platform and translation management system. The company is headquartered remotely and operates globally.

== Overview ==
Founded in 2017, Lokalise is a B2B SaaS company that streamlines the localization process for product, development, design, marketing, and localization teams. The platform integrates with over 60 third-party tools, including GitHub, GitLab, Figma, Contentful, and Zendesk. Lokalise combines human translation with AI orchestration, automatically choosing between multiple AI engines based on context, language pair, and content type.

== History ==
Lokalise was founded in 2017 in Riga, Latvia, by Nick Ustinov and Petr Antropov, who identified a need for a developer-centric localization platform that could integrate into modern software workflows. Drawing from their own experiences in software development, they aimed to create a solution that would streamline the localization process for agile teams.

Initially bootstrapped, Lokalise achieved early traction through a product-led growth strategy, attracting a customer base across various industries. In September 2020, the company raised its first external funding, securing $6 million in a Series A round led by Mike Chalfen, with participation from Capital300 and several angel investors, including Andrey Khusid (Miro), Nicolas Dessaigne (Algolia), and Des Traynor (Intercom). This investment enabled Lokalise to expand its team, enhance its platform, and transition to a fully remote work model.

Building on this momentum, Lokalise announced a $50 million Series B funding round in December 2021, led by CRV, with participation from Creandum, Dawn Capital, and existing investors such as Chalfen Ventures, 3VC, and S16VC. This round enabled the company to enhance its AI capabilities, build out enterprise-grade features, and grow its team across engineering, sales, and customer success. Around this time, Lokalise began expanding its use case coverage beyond core product localization to include marketing and support content.

In October 2023, Lokalise underwent a leadership transition, with Sophie Krishnan appointed as the new CEO. Krishnan brought experience in scaling SaaS businesses. Co-founders Ustinov and Antropov remained involved, with Ustinov taking on the role of Chief Innovation Officer and Antropov focusing on strategy and corporate development.

As of today, the company has expanded its customer base to over 3,000 organizations worldwide, including clients like Mastercard, Toyota, HP, Revolut, Notion, and Yelp.

== Products and services ==
Lokalise offers a cloud-based translation management and localization platform that enables businesses to streamline multilingual content creation. The platform supports the localization of mobile apps, websites, software, games, and marketing materials. Customers can choose from multiple translation options—professional human translation services, pre-approved content reuse via translation memory, or AI-powered translation, which automates the process with contextual accuracy. Lokalise's AI orchestration selects an engine (such as DeepL, Claude Sonnet 3.5, GPT-4o, or Google Translate) for each content type and language pair.

With over 60 native integrations—including GitHub, Figma, Jira, Contentful, and Zendesk—Lokalise fits into development and content workflows. Its automation capabilities allow teams to automate quality assurance (QA) checks, manage branching workflows, perform in-context editing, and deploy content using over-the-air (OTA) updates. The platform is also accessible via API and SDKs for custom development.

== Funding and investors ==
Lokalise began as a bootstrapped company, achieving early traction and growth without external capital. In September 2020, the company raised its Series A funding round of $6 million, led by investor Mike Chalfen, with participation from Dawn Capital and other investors. This investment helped Lokalise scale its product, grow its engineering and go-to-market teams, and expand globally across North America, Europe, and Asia-Pacific.

In December 2021, Lokalise secured a Series B funding round of $50 million, led by CRV. The round saw participation from Creandum, Dawn Capital, and existing investors including Chalfen Ventures, 3VC, S16VC, and several angel investors. This investment enabled Lokalise to accelerate hiring, enhance product development, and expand its partnership ecosystem.

== Key partnerships and integrations ==
Lokalise has integrated with an array of platforms across the software development and content ecosystem:

- GitHub, GitLab, Bitbucket
- Figma, Sketch
- Contentful, WordPress, Storyblok, Hygraph
- Zendesk, Intercom
- API and CLI access for custom workflows

Language Service Providers include: Argos, Acclaro, Translated, Language Inspired, and several others.

Through its Solutions Partner Program, Lokalise collaborates with digital agencies, localization providers, and tech consultants.

== Technical features ==
Lokalise provides a cloud-based platform for software localization and translation management. Key technical functions include over-the-air (OTA) updates for mobile and web applications and integrations with design software such as Figma and Sketch. The platform's infrastructure supports task automation through webhooks and project branching.

Since 2023, the company has incorporated generative AI into its service offerings [X]. This includes an orchestration engine that selects machine translation models based on the specific language pair and content type. In late 2023, the platform added features for automated glossary enforcement and language quality assurance (LQA) tasks. These were followed by integrations connecting translation memory with AI-driven variants for rephrasing content.

Between 2022 and 2024, the platform expanded its technical ecosystem through the release of software development kits (SDKs) for Flutter, Node.js, and Ruby. During this period, it established integrations with third-party platforms including Webflow, Hygraph, and Freshdesk. In June 2024, the company announced the development of "Workflows," a feature aimed at automating content exchange and progress tracking within localization pipelines.

== Awards and recognition ==
G2 Awards:

- Named a leader for 13+ consecutive quarters (as of Fall 2022)
- Top rankings in categories like Computer-Assisted Translation, Localization Software, and Translation Management Software
- Multiple awards in G2's 2023, 2024, and 2025 reports

Frost & Sullivan:

- Top 3 Translation Management Systems, 2024

Accel:

- Included in the Top 100 European Cloud Companies (2020)

Sifted:

- Named a top SaaS startup to watch in Europe (2021)

== See also ==
- Crowdin
- Phrase
- Poedit
- Transifex
- Weblate
