= OAXAL =

OAXAL: Open Architecture for XML Authoring and Localization is an Organization for the Advancement of Structured Information Standards (OASIS) standards-based initiative to encourage the development of an open Standards approach to XML Authoring and Localization. OAXAL is an official OASIS Reference Architecture Technical Committee.

On 11 December 2009, the OASIS OAXAL TC approved the OAXAL v1.0 Reference Model as an official OASIS Committee Specification.

The Open Architecture for XML Authoring and Localization (OAXAL) represents a comprehensive, efficient, and cost-effective model regarding the authoring and translation aspects of XML publishing. OAXAL encompasses the following key Open Standards:

- XML - Extensible Markup Language (XML) is a simple, flexible text format originally designed to meet the challenges of large-scale electronic publishing. XML also plays an increasingly important role in the exchange of a wide variety of data on the Web and elsewhere.
- Unicode (Unicode) - A character encoding scheme that encompasses all character sets.
- W3C ITS (W3C ITS) - An XML vocabulary that defines translatability rules for a given XML document type.
- SRX (SRX) - Segmentation Rules eXchange, a LISA OSCAR standard defining text-subdivision rules for each language. Please also see the Wikipedia article for SRX.
- xml:tm (xml:tm) - XML-based text memory, a LISA OSCAR standard for author memory (a history of segments and revisions) and translation memory (a history of translated segments).
- GMX (GMX) - Global Information Management Metrics Exchange, a LISA OSCAR standard for word and character count and metrics (for volume, complexity, and quality) exchange.
- TMX (TMX) - Translation Memory eXchange, a LISA OSCAR standard for exchanging translation memories.
- Unicode TR29 (Unicode TR29) - The primary Unicode standard defining word and sentence boundaries.
- Open Standard XML Vocabularies, including DITA (DITA), Docbook (Docbook), XHTML (XHTML), SVG (SVG), ODF (ODF), and others that may emerge as standards.
- XLIFF (XLIFF) - XML Localization Interchange File Format, an OASIS standard for exchanging Localization data.

== Online documentation ==
The full version of the OAXAL Reference Architecture is available online in wiki or PDF form.
