= Ratel (disambiguation) =

A ratel (Mellivora capensis) is a small mammal, also known as a honey badger.

Ratel may also refer to:

- Radio Telecommunications, a method of communicating over a radio used in the Australian Army and Australian Army Cadets
- Ratel IFV, a family of wheeled infantry vehicles in service with the South African Army
- Stéphane Ratel Organisation, organizer of the FIA GT Championship, ADAC GT Masters, Belcar, FIA GT3 and other motorsport series
- Ratel, a software application part of the Okapi Framework to create and maintain SRX segmentation rules
- Ratel, The codename assigned to Hitomi Uzaki, the main character from the Japanese manga series Killing Bites who is a genetically engineered hybrid of a human and a honey badger.
- Ratel S: A Ukrainian UGV (Unmanned Ground Vehicle) designed for remote mining and kamikaze missions using anti-tank mines.
