= Kilinux =

Linux distribution

Kilinux (klnX), the Open Swahili Localization Project, is a project by the Swedish International Development Agency (SIDA), the University of Dar es Salaam (UDSM), and IT+46 for localizing major applications to the Swahili language.

It is based in Tanzania and runs on Linux, and aims to create an operating system in Swahili, which is spoken by an estimated 100 million people. The project was started as a joint effort between the University of Dar es Salaam and Swedish company IT +46.

== Background ==
Swahili is a Bantu language spoken by about 100 million people in Kenya, Tanzania, Uganda, Malawi, Mozambique and other areas in or near the African Great Lakes region. Most users are using Microsoft Windows and Microsoft Office, but since that is not available in Swahili, they have to use English or French. Kilinux tried to reduce the threshold by localizing Open Office. In June 2004 Microsoft announced a Swahili version of Windows.

== History ==
How can ICT develop Tanzania by adopting it in English in secondary education when only less than 12 per cent of the relevant age group enter into secondary schools?

— A participant in the workshop The future of ICT in Secondary Schools - Strategizing for Implementation in January 2005

The Kilinux project began in 2003 with the development of a glossary and a spell checker for OpenOffice.org.

The Kilinux Project received an award in May 2006 as the best ICT project in the category education of the 2006 Stockholm challenge.

== Swahili IT Glossary ==
In October 2004 Kilinux released a Swahili IT Glossary under the Creative Commons ShareAlike license containing over 1500 "computer related terms in English and their Swahili equivalents", because the Swahili language did not contain any computer terminology.

== Jambo OpenOffice ==
The first major release by the project — Jambo OpenOffice (Hello OpenOffice) — was a localised version of OpenOffice.org, an open source office suite, and was aimed primarily at schools and colleges.

== Jambo Firefox ==
On 15 June 2006, the project announced they had localised the web browser Mozilla Firefox.
