= Proxecto Trasno =

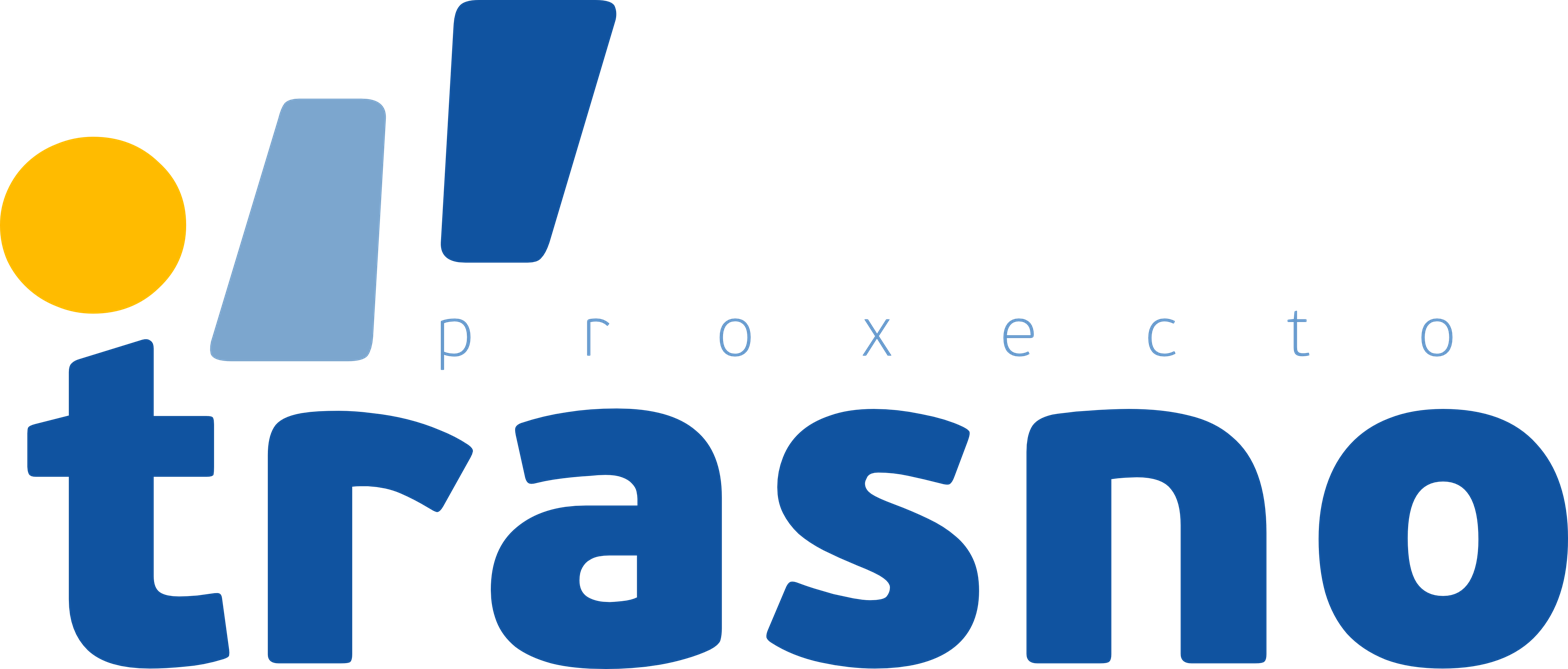
Proxecto Trasno logotype

The Proxecto Trasno is an open community dedicated to localise open-source software to Galician language. Since it was founded at the end of 1999, its volunteers have been engaged in the Galician translation of the main FLOSS projects, from desktop environments to Linux distributions and in creating spell-checkers or developing localization tools.

Since 2009, it has been legally protected by the non-profit association Asociación Cultural Proxecto Trasno, founded by volunteers of the project.

== Software developed at the community ==
Aside of focusing on localizing, some people at the community developed tools to manage terminological resources and translation debates:

- Tiboxe: TiBoXe server is a web-application server that allows to work with terminologic information based on translations from open source projects translations. TiBoXe stands on TBX format, a standard that allows to exchange terminological information with XML files. Released in 2009 in GPL v3.
- Trobador: Online web server for translation memories search and management. Supports the TMX format and allows multiple projects and users management. Released on 2011 under a MIT license.
- Glósima: terminology discussion tool. Licensed under CC BY 2.5.
- Terminator: Terminator is a web based terminological management system providing collaborative discussion for multiple languages using multiple glossaries, with export to TBX standard and flexible online search as well. It's intended to be used for providing support for terminology creation and management in the free software localization processes. It's licensed under GPLv3.
