= Gtranslator =

Free computer-assisted translation software

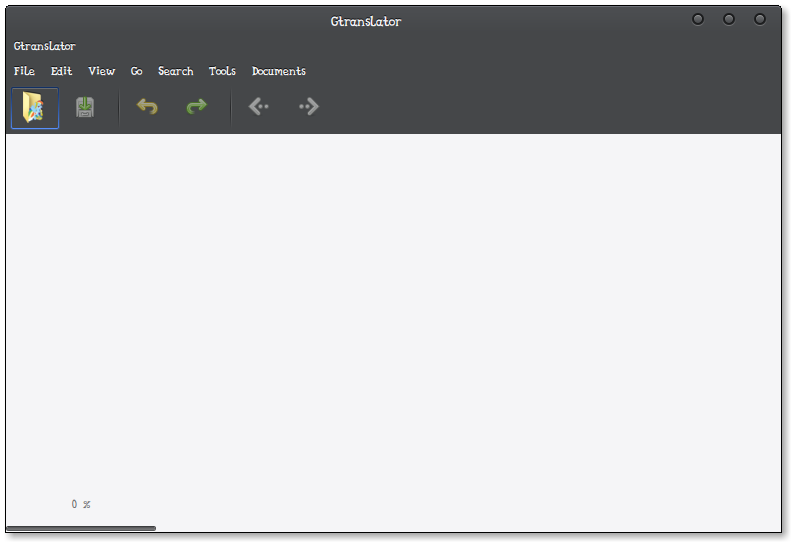
- Gtranslator 2.91.6 under MATE.
- Original author: Fatih Demir
- Developer: The GNOME Project
- Release: 2000; 26 years ago
- Stable release: 47.1 / 2 December 2024; 20 months ago
- Written in: C
- Operating system: Unix-like
- Platform: Cross-platform
- Available in: Multilingual
- Type: Computer-assisted translation
- License: GPLv3+ (free software)
- Website: wiki.gnome.org/Apps/Gtranslator
- Repository: gitlab.gnome.org/GNOME/gtranslator.git

Gtranslator is a specialized computer-assisted translation software and po file editor for the internationalization and localization (i18n) of software that uses the gettext system. It handles all forms of gettext po files and includes features such as Find/Replace, Translation Memory, different Translator Profiles, Messages Table (for having an overview of the translations/messages in the po file), Easy Navigation and Editing of translation messages and comments of the translation where accurate. Gtranslator includes also a plugin system with plugins such as Alternate Language, Insert Tags, Open Tran, Integration with Subversion, and Source Code Viewer. Gtranslator is written in the programming language C for the GNOME desktop environment. It is available as free software under the terms of the GNU General Public License (GPL).

In line with modern GNOME app naming conventions, Gtranslator has been renamed to GNOME Translation Editor

== Features ==
Gtranslator offers the following features:

- Open several PO files in tabs
- Plural forms support
- Automatic headers update
- Comments editing
- Management of different translator profiles
- Translation Memories
- Assistant to configure initial profile and TM
- Search dialog and quick navigation among the messages
- Toolbar editor
- Highlight whitespaces and messages syntax

== Plugins ==
Gtranslator also includes a plugin system:

- Character Map: Insert special characters by clicking on them
- Dictionary: Look up words in a dictionary
- Alternate Language: Load another translation of the PO file in order to see at the same time the original messages and their translations in the alternate language
- Fullscreen: Place window in the fullscreen state
- Insert Params: Parameters detection and easy insertion
- Insert Tags: Tags detection and easy insertion
- Source code view: Show the message in the source code
- Subversion: A Subversion client plugin based on libsvn

Standalone plugins:

- Punctuation: Checks the exactness of punctuations of translation. It has also additional features such a ignoring tags and recognizing three dot as a single punctuation
- Gtranslator-spell: Spell checking plug-in which uses Enchant libraries instead of gtk-spell. Can check whole po file for spelling mistakes and such

== See also ==
- gettext
