= Numeronym =

Number-based word

A numeronym is a word, usually an abbreviation, composed partially or wholly of numerals. The term can be used to describe several different number-based constructs, but it most commonly refers to a contraction in which all letters between the first and last of a word are replaced with the number of omitted letters (for example, "i18n" for "internationalization"). According to Anne H. Soukhanov, editor of the Microsoft Encarta College Dictionary, it originally referred to phonewords – words spelled by the letters of keys of a telephone pad.

A numeronym can also be called an alphanumeric acronym or alphanumeric abbreviation.

== Types ==
=== Homophones ===
A number may be substituted into a word where its pronunciation matches that of the omitted letters. For example, "K9" is pronounced "kay-nine", which sounds like "canine" (relating to dogs).

Examples of numeronyms based on homophones include:

- sk8r: skater
- B4: before
- l8r: later; L8R, also sometimes abbreviated as L8ER, is commonly used in chat rooms and other text based communications as a way of saying goodbye.
- G2G: "good to go", "got to go", or "get together", also found as "GTG".
- gr8: "great"
- P2P: "pay-to-play" or "peer-to-peer"
- F2P: "free-to-play"
- T2UL/T2YL: "talk to you later", also found as "TTYL".
- B2B: "business-to-business"
- B2C: "business-to-consumer"
- c2c: "City to Coast"

=== Numerical contractions ===
To contract the word accessibility, the eleven letters between the a and y are replaced with 11, forming a11y.

Alternatively, letters between the first and last letters of a word may be replaced by the number of letters omitted. For example, the word "internationalization" can be abbreviated by replacing the eighteen middle letters ("nternationalizatio") with "18", leaving "i18n". Sometimes the last letter is also counted and omitted. These word shortenings are sometimes called numerical contractions.

According to Tex Texin, the first numeronym of this kind was "S12n", the electronic mail account name given to Digital Equipment Corporation (DEC) employee Jan Scherpenhuizen by a system administrator because his surname was too long to be an account name. The use of such numeronyms became part of DEC corporate culture.

Examples of numerical contractions:

- a11y – accessibility
- c12s – communications
- c14n – containerization or canonicalization
- d14n – decentralization
- E15 – The Eyjafjallajökull volcano in Iceland
- g11n – globalization
- i14y – interoperability
- i18n – internationalization
- K8s – Kubernetes
- l10n – localization
- m12n – modularization
- o11n – orchestration
- o11y – observability
- p13n – personalization

=== Purely numeric ===
Some numeronyms are composed entirely of numbers, such as "212" for "New Yorker", "4-1-1" for "information", "9-1-1" for "help", "101" for "basic introduction to a subject", and "4-20" for "Cannabis". Words of this type have existed for decades, including those in 10-code, which has been in use since before World War II. Chapter or title numbers of some jurisdictions' statutes have become numeronyms, for example 5150 and 187 from California's penal code. Largely because the production of many American movies and television programs are based in California, usage of these terms has spread beyond its original location and user population.

Examples of purely numeric words include:

- 64 – Tiananmen Square protests of 1989
- 69 – 69 (sex position)
- 86 – slang for the unavailability of an item, or the prohibition of a person, especially in restaurants
- 88 - Neo-nazi reference to Heil Hitler, as H is the eight letter of the alphabet
- 143 – I love you
- 187 – slang for "murder", based on section 187 of the California Penal Code
- 421 – Fortune
- 520 – I love you (one of many numeronyms used in Chinese Internet Slang)
- 8:46 – The length of time associated with the murder of George Floyd (May 25, 2020 in Minneapolis).
- 2137 – Time of day at which John Paul II died
- 1312 – ACAB (All Cops Are Bastards)

=== Repeated letters ===
A number may also denote how many times the character before or after it is repeated. This is typically used to represent a name or phrase in which several consecutive words start with the same letter, as in W3 (World Wide Web) or W3C (World Wide Web Consortium). Amazon Web Services uses this in naming some of its popular services such as S3 (Simple Storage Service) and EC2 (Elastic Cloud Compute)

=== SI prefixes ===
Numeronyms can also make use of SI prefixes, as are commonly used to abbreviate long numbers (e.g. "1k" for 1000 or "1M" for 1000000).

Examples of numeronyms using SI prefixes include:

- Y2K fashion - "year 2000 fashion" (see also Y2K aesthetic)
  - Y2K problem – Year 2000 problem
- Y2K38 problem – Year 2038 problem
- C10k problem – Ten-thousand concurrent connections problem

== See also ==
- Leet or leetspeak
- Nominal number
- -onym
