= Website localization =

Website adaptation process

Website localization is the process of adapting an existing website to local language and culture in the target market. It is the process of adapting a website into a different linguistic and cultural context— involving much more than the simple translation of text. This modification process must reflect specific language and cultural preferences in the content, images and overall design and requirements of the site – all while maintaining the integrity of the website. Culturally adapted web sites reduce the amount of required cognitive efforts from visitors of the site to process and access information, making navigation easier and attitudes toward the web site more favorable. The modification of the website must additionally take into consideration the stated purpose of the new website with a focus on the targeted audience/market in the new locale. Website localization aims to customize a website so that it seems "natural", to its viewers despite cultural differences between the creators and the audience. Two factors are involved—programming expertise and linguistic/cultural knowledge.

The proliferation of website localization is the result of the popularity of computer and Internet users. People all over the world treat the Internet as their main location for information and services. These people do not all speak the same language. As a result, website localization has become one of the primary tools for business global expansion. By 2025, the global localization industry was estimated at more than 70 billion US dollars, with website localization services alone forming a multibillion-dollar segment.

Due to website communication across multiple cultures for multiple needs, the Internet has given rise to non professional translation practices. Because website localization involves mixed strategies, organizations tend to maintain a global image while using website localization to appeal to local users. The challenge of website localization has become even more important as websites increasingly have the potential to both supplement and replace presence in foreign markets. As web design becomes more congruent with national culture, it will foster online consumer purchasing. Creators take into account the "language, education level, belief and value systems, [and] traditions and habits" of the target culture in order to optimize results.

== Process ==
Website localization is more than mere translation. Translating only solves partial language problems. Measurement units must be converted; images and text are modified to appeal to the target culture.

The process of website localization is complex and involves three different levels of adaptation. First is translation. Website localization involves adapting any text being used into the language of the country. It is important that translation of information be "clear and understandable" to avoid cultural misunderstanding or offense. In order to translate, the "target culture" must be known. Second is the actual localization, which includes translation but also involves all other efforts and activities to ensure that the adaptation of textual materials, visual displays, illustrations and graphics are "linguistically and culturally appropriate for the target locale." Target locale is understood as the "market segment defined by criteria including language, currency, and perhaps educational level or income bracket." Among the many technical elements which can be localized are: date and time formats, currency formats, number formats, address and telephone number formats, units of measure and connection speed. In order to ensure effective communication during the localization process, it is important to consider the following items: information architecture, theme and navigation, graphics, photographs, audio, and visual. Third is internationalization, which involves making sure that the software being used is fully compatible with the technology of the country in question.

There are two important considerations to keep in mind during the process of website localization. The first is to focus on the demands of the user. The readers of the "localized version of the website" want to be able to read and understand the pages in a way that makes sense to them. A second consideration is to take into account the goals of the client, whether an institution, government or individual, for example.

== Backend localization ==
Many elements of a website that are different according to the locale of the client need only minor manual changes by a localizer, or none at all. For example, the system on which the website is created should automatically produce the correct currency symbol based on the country in which the client is located.

- Website Analytics Software: This software can be created once generally, and then applied to each of the localized domains.
- Site Search: Results can be reviewed using an algorithm that sifts through possible results using metadata. For example, a consumer who makes a query in the United States should not be shown a good that can only be purchased in Portugal.
- Testimonials: Comments and feedback are often a vital part of a website. Localization efforts usually only include censorship. This can be done largely by software, however human review is sometimes necessary.
- Information Storage: Databases are often used to store large amounts of information. They can be used to store generic data, like product information, as well as more specific information pertaining to certain locales.

Search engines are directed to the correct language or regional version of a page through markup such as hreflang annotations, which declare the relationship between equivalent pages so that each localized version, rather than a single default, appears in the relevant regional search results.

== The business of website localization ==
Using website localization to its best advantage is vital to any business seeking to move into international markets. With more and more companies seeking to tap into these lucrative markets, website localization has become quite profitable. The business side involves global and local coordination; production and operations, including finance; sales and marketing; language translation, including technology and linguistic coordination; software engineering, as well as design. The higher the technological abilities of the target culture, the more likely it is for website localization to be implemented and used effectively.

== See also ==
- Internationalization and localization
- Language localisation
