= Korean Academy of Taekwondo =

Academy of Taekwondo

Coordinates: 39°41′47.58″N 104°47′28.32″W

- Also known as: KAT
- Date founded: February 1980; 46 years ago
- Country of origin: United States
- Founder: Jae Kyu Chung
- Current head: Bill Pottle
- Arts taught: Taekwondo
- Official website: http://www.kattaekwondo.com/

The Korean Academy of Taekwondo is one of Colorado's Taekwondo and martial arts schools. The school was founded in February 1980 by Grandmaster Jae Kyu Chung. The school has produced numerous tournament champions and has trained thousands of students throughout the years. They have also contributed several non-peer reviewed articles on the physics and mechanics of martial arts. The school has several locations in Colorado and has at times had locations in Texas and Baghdad, Iraq.

== School history ==
Grandmaster Chung's first school was in Aurora, Colorado, later moving to the Mississippi address. In the mid nineties, he transferred control over the Aurora school to his student, Master Ghassan Timani. Master Ghassan continued to exercise control over the Korean Academy and Master Chung sold all three of the schools, returning to Korea to pursue a career in politics. While in Korea, he served as the head of security for Kim Dae-Jung, the former president of South Korea. Master Ghassan is the highest student of Grandmaster Chung in the world. After moving and expanding several times, the Aurora location is now in a facility on E. Mississippi built especially for Taekwondo by Master Ghassan.

In 2004, the Korean Academy saw the addition of Master Bill Pottle, one of the Korean Academy's highest ranking students. After getting his black belt from the Korean Academy, Master Bill trained at Cornell University and the University of Pennsylvania where he was pursuing academic and professional interests.

Master Ghassan has now passed the school on to Master Pottle, who has overseen its continued success and growth. Since then, the Korean Academy of Taekwondo has continued to expand. Master Emelio Tio moved to Texas where he opened an independent KAT Texas branch. Master Pottle has also opened a KAT South Branch in Colorado.

In 2005, the Korean Academy of Taekwondo was the featured school of USA Taekwondo. In October 2005 their fundraiser kickathon was covered by the local news media.

Recently, the school has moved towards a much more scientific basis of training. They were featured in an article by the Korean Embassy on the modernization of the art. In 2005 they held their 100th promotion test and

In 2010, the school expanded a branch to Loveland, CO. Three instructors were featured in the national press about older students training in Taekwondo.

Numerous students and instructors have served on the Colorado State Taekwondo Association board.

== Notable Firsts ==
In November 2013, the school published the first ever martial arts instruction audiobook.

In August 2014, the school held the first ever Ninja Mile themed race, where students completed martial arts challenges along the course to earn bonus time reductions. The race was attended by then congressman Mike Coffman who broke a board.

In December 2017, the school became the first martial arts school in the world to secure their black belt records on the Ethereum blockchain.

In 2019, the school released the first free and open source software that uses the K Nearest Neighbors algorithm to automatically group tournament competitors into fair divisions and then generates various styles of brackets for those divisions.

== Head Instructors ==
The school was founded by Grandmaster Jae Kyu Chung, the first head instructor. Before coming to America, Grandmaster Chung was influential in Brazilian Taekwondo. In 1987, he coached the US Team to a near sweep in the Pan-AM Games In his March, 1997 Farewell Address, outgoing United States Taekwondo Union President Hwa Chong thanked Grandmaster Chung for his role in helping to get Taekwondo to be a full medal sport in the Olympics.

Master Ghassan Timani has been a major player in Colorado Taekwondo since before he took over the school in 1995. He has served over a decade as an officer of the Colorado State Taekwondo Association, currently as Treasurer. He has been quoted in a number of print articles on martial arts and In 2000, he was selected as an official delegate to attend the Olympics for the USA. In 2004 Master Ghassan Timani transferred the school to Master Bill Pottle

Master Bill Pottle joined the school in 1992. In 1997, he left to attend Cornell University, where he is mentioned several times in their club history He was also captain of the first ever Ivy/Northeast Collegiate Taekwondo League All Star Team. He also is the Taekwondo faculty member at Metro State University of Denver, which is one of the oldest for-credit martial arts programs in the United States. In 2023, he won a gold medal in sparring at the Asia Pacific Masters Games

== Other notable members ==
The school has had several other notable members, including Ron Roe, a 60-year-old legally blind man who recently graduated from college and received his black belt, and Danny Dietz, a Navy SEAL who earned his black belt. He was killed in an ambush in Afghanistan that became the inspiration for the movie Lone Survivor.

Komiljon Latipov is a former Tajikistan national team member and silver medalist in the Central Asian Games

Matt Bailey is a competition team coach. While he was serving in the US Air Force he was also a member of the world class athlete program.

Joshua Kosloski is a black belt sparring competitor who won 2nd place in the 2011 Pan Am Open Taekwondo Championships He also won the 2011 USA Taekwondo World Class Black Belt Sparring Competition (10-11 Finweight) without any of his opponents scoring a kick or punch against him. This distinction also earned him the Chanel 9 News Top Olympic Sports Moment for 2011. He also became the first athlete from the United States to ever win the world championships in the 12-14 year old division. In 2015, Josh and his sister Grace Kosloski both won first place in the AAU national championships.

During 2013 Olympians Alisher Gulov and Farkhod Negmatov and national team members Khusrav Giyosov (Tajikistan) and Ahmed Alsubaihawi (Iraq) trained at the school to prepare for the 2013 World Taekwondo Championships

== Published work ==
The school has published several articles, although none have been in peer reviewed journals. One article is on the physics of board breaking another one is on Distance, called “The Donut of Danger”. Students in the school have also written articles on using Game Theory in Taekwondo and the effect of Taekwondo training on Self Esteem.

The school also carried out one of the only studies comparing the statistical probability of scoring on different electronic chest protectors from the same manufacturer (2020 Armor and Daedo), as well as converting dimensionless Daedo units to kinetic energy values.

Bill and Katie Pottle have published a book on martial arts pedagogy as well as The Way of the Dojo: Owning and Operating your own Martial Arts School.

They have also taken the rather uncommon step of publishing the school handbook - The Korean Academy of Taekwondo Official School Handbook - and making it available to the public.

== Current Locations ==
Korean Academy of Taekwondo - Aurora (Headquarters) 16850 E. Mississippi Ave Aurora, CO 80017

Korean Academy of Taekwondo - Littleton (also LaKai Taekwondo) 621 Southpark Dr Suite 1100 Littleton, CO 80120
