= Xml:tm =

XML translation standard

xml:tm (XML-based Text Memory) is a standard for XML to allow ease of translation of XML documents.

xml:tm forms part of the Open Architecture for XML Authoring and Localization reference architecture.
