= Django CMS =

Content management system

django CMS

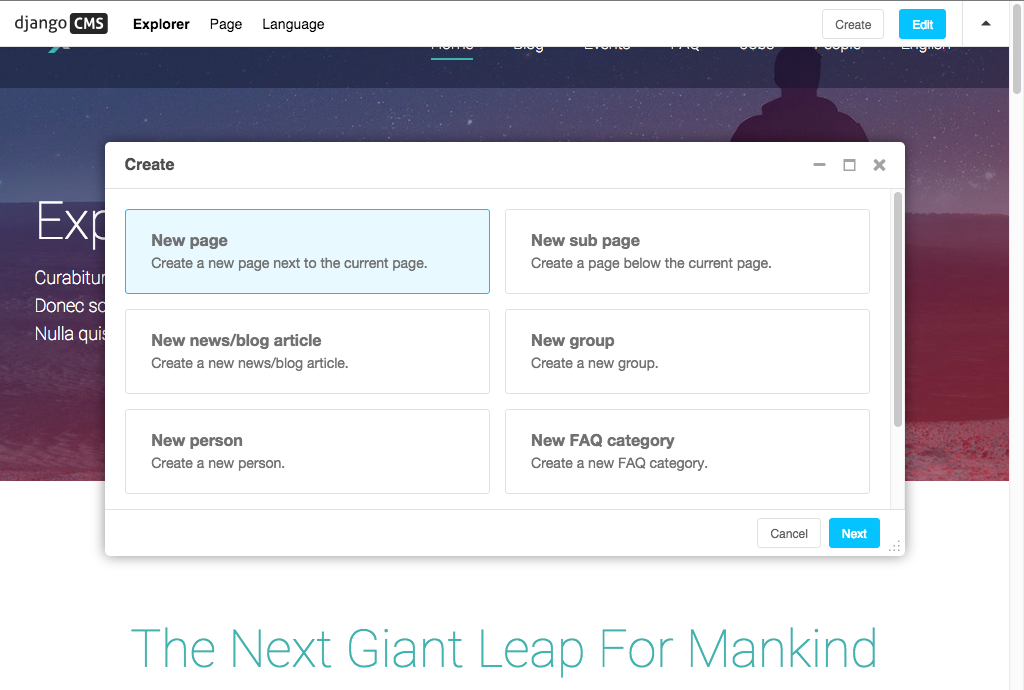
- Screenshot Create content with django CMS using the free and open-source Explorer Theme
- Developer: django CMS Association
- Release: May 2007; 19 years ago
- Stable release: 3.11.3 / 25 April 2023; 3 years ago
- Written in: Python
- Operating system: Cross-platform
- Platform: Django
- Available in: 16+ languages
- List of languages Arabic, Croatian, Czech, Dutch, French, German, Italian, Japanese, Lithuanian, Persian, Polish, Portuguese, Portuguese (Brazil), Russian, Spanish, Ukrainian
- Type: Content management system
- License: Revised BSD License
- Website: django-cms.org
- Repository: github.com/django-cms

django CMS is a free and open source content management system platform for publishing content on the World Wide Web and intranets. It is written in the Django web framework (written in Python).

== History ==
django CMS 1.0 was created by Thomas Steinacher.

django CMS 2.0 was a complete rewrite of the system by Patrick Lauber, itself based on a fork of django-page-cms.

django CMS 3.0 was released in 2013.

As of 10 June 2016, django CMS 3.0 is compatible with Django versions 1.8 and 1.7.

As of 15 September 2016, django CMS 3.4 introduced a Long Term Support (LTS) release cycle.

As of 5 March 2018, django CMS 3.5 introduced structure board decoupled from page rendering and offer Page copy between sites, compatible with Django 1.8 to 1.11

As of 29 January 2019, django CMS 3.6 introduced Django 2.0 and 2.1 support

As of 25 September 2019, django CMS 3.7 introduced Django 2.2 support

As of 22 April 2020, Django CMS 3.7 introduced Django 3.0 support

As of 30 June 2021, django CMS 3.9 introduced Django 3.2 support

In July 2020 Divio, which had originally developed django CMS and had maintained it up to that point, handed over responsibility for the open-source project to the newly founded django CMS Association (dCA). Divio remains committed to django CMS as a sponsor of the django CMS website and as one of the founding members of the dCA, along with what. and Eliga Services.

As of April 2023 the current (Jan 2025) version 4.1 (LTS) appeared, while modules continue to be updated through 2025.

As of September 24, 2026, version 5.1.3 was released.

== Translations ==
django CMS handles multilingual content by default. Its administration interface supports several languages.

Transifex is used to manage the translations of the project. The current status of the translations can be found here.

== Features ==
Frontend-editing
edit all plugins within the page.
Reusable plugins
use django CMS plugins in your own apps.
Flexible Plugin Architecture
build flexible pages with a wide range of plugins.
Search Engine Optimization
the structure of the pages is optimized for indexing.
Editorial workflow
workflows for publishing and approval.
Permission Management
set specific rights to different users.
Versioning
each modification of the page will be saved. You can restore any state you wish.
Multisites
administer multiple websites over the same admin interface.
Multilanguage
support for different languages (i.e. Arabic, Chinese or Russian)
Applications (Apps)
add apps to different pages of the CMS.
Media Asset Manager (MAM)
allows you to manage all kind of assets (pictures, PDFs, videos and other documents).

== See also ==
- Content management system
- List of content management systems
