= Memsource =

- Developer: Memsource a.s.
- Platform: Windows, MacOS, Linux, Android, iOS
- Successor: Phrase
- Type: Computer-assisted translation
- License: Commercial
- Website: www.phrase.com

Memsource was a cloud-based commercial translation management system and computer-assisted translation (CAT) tool. It was developed by Memsource a.s., headquartered in Prague, Czech Republic. According to research by Deloitte, in 2020 Memsource a.s was one of the top 50 fastest growing IT companies in Central Europe.

Following Memsource a.s.' acquisition of TMS Phrase, the Memsource software branding was abandoned in favor of Phrase's. Phrase continues to be developed as the successor to Memsource.

== History ==
Memsource was founded in 2010 by David Čaněk, with Memsource Cloud having a public launch at the beginning of 2011.

In the third quarter of 2015, the milestone of over a billion translated words was surpassed on the Memsource platform.

In May 2018, Memsource was granted a patent for its AI non-translatables feature and in October 2018, launched its second AI feature, a quality estimation endpoint to enable users to see MT quality scores before post-editing.

In 2019, Memsource was ranked as the Most Viable Product in the Marketflex for Language-Oriented TMS, published by Common Sense Advisory (CSA) research.

In July 2020, The Carlyle Group acquired a controlling share in Memsource for an undisclosed sum.

In January 2021, Memsource a.s acquired the Hamburg-based TMS Phrase. In the acquisition, the Memsource software was rebranded to Phrase.

== Features ==
Memsource's features included support for translation memory, termbases, automatic quality assurance, CMS connectors, REST API, and 3rd party machine translation engine connectors. Machine translation was also natively supported through the Memsource Translate hub, which included AI-powered management features such as fully managed engines, MT Autoselect and machine translation quality estimation. The platform supported over 50 file types, including custom file types.

Memsource was available for Windows, Mac, and Linux systems. It was also accessible through a mobile application on Android and iOS devices.
