= Pottles Bay =

Bay in Labrador, Canada

Coordinates: 54.4822°N 57.5287°W

Pottles Bay (also Pottle Bay) is a natural bay on the coast of Labrador in the province of Newfoundland and Labrador, Canada. It is fed by the Northwest Brook basin and drains into the Labrador Sea.
