= Bill Pottle =

American writer (born 1978)

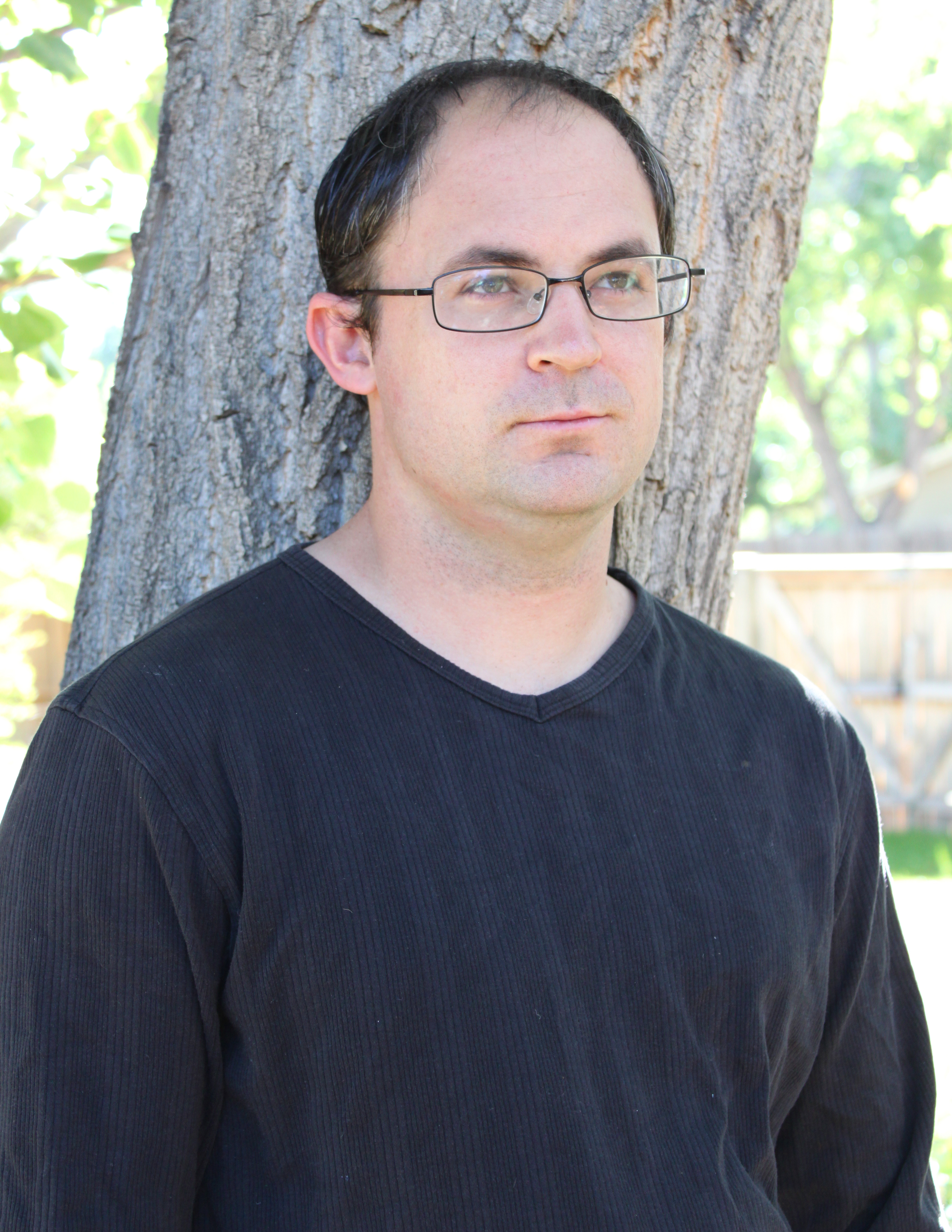
- Born: July 12, 1978 (age 48); Denver, Colorado, U.S.
- Occupations: Martial Artist, Teacher and Writer
- Writing career
- Genre: Fantasy Christianity
- Website: billpottle.com

Bill Pottle is an author of books on Fantasy, Martial Arts, and Christianity. He has been writing for over twenty years. His most recent work is published by Ellechor Publishing House and is promoted by Maria Connor at My Author Concierge.

== Lands of Daranor ==
Bill's first series was the Lands of Daranor series which started with DreamQuest (2003). The story continued in ProphecyQuest (2005) The trilogy concludes with SwordQuest, currently in development.

The Lands of Daranor series take place in a fictional land and chronicle Tarthur and his friends as they battle against several foes. Major themes include the transition from childhood to adulthood, the nature of humanity, and the interplay between magic, faith, and destiny. Bill started writing DreamQuest while a sixth grader at Prairie Middle School

== Martial Arts ==
Bill has written three books on martial arts, co-authored with his wife Katie Pottle. The Korean Academy of Taekwondo School Handbook was originally published in 2005 with subsequent editions in 2007 and 2011. Teaching Martial Arts: A Practical Guide was published in 2009, and covered several areas of martial arts pedagogy as well as injury care and prevention. The Way of the Dojo: Owning and Operating your own Martial Arts School was published in 2012. In 2014 they also published "The Princess and the Ogre: Martial Arts Based Nursery Rhymes and Fairy Tales."

== Angel Wars Saga ==
Bill's most recent series is the Angel Wars Saga. This work retells the human history through a perspective that is a combination of Biblical and Scientific thought. They key idea, first put forth by Sir John Polkinghorne is that the Heisenburg Uncertainty Principle gives a 'veil' for God to influence the natural world and yet remain undetectable by science. The first book, Alizel's Song, was published in 2013 by Ellechor Publishing House.

== Critical reception ==
Bill's work has received positive reception from both professionals and everyday readers. Jeri Kladder, Chair of the Newbery Award Committee commented "I really loved DreamQuest, and ProphecyQuest is so much stronger." Lloyd Alexander called DreamQuest "Splendid" and ProphecyQuest "Wonderful". Dr. Chinedum Osuji, a Yale professor and 2004 Taekwondo Olympian called Teaching Martial Arts "a rare and invaluably comprehensive guide" while Master Dan Chuang, head of MIT Taekwondo and multiple time National Collegiate Taekwondo Coach of the Year said the work was a "comprehensive list of drills and concepts that are sure to be useful to martial arts teachers everywhere."

April Chase called DreamQuest an "Imaginative and entertaining fantasy" Aphelion Webzine Sr. Editor Dan Hollison said the book was "well plotted and well thought out."

== Personal life ==
Bill lives with his wife and family in Colorado. He is a part-time professor at Metro State University and the Community College of Aurora. He is also the third head master of the Korean Academy of Taekwondo. He has a master's degree in Biological Engineering from Cornell University. He also holds a 6th Degree Black belt in Taekwondo
