= Gridly =

Localization platform

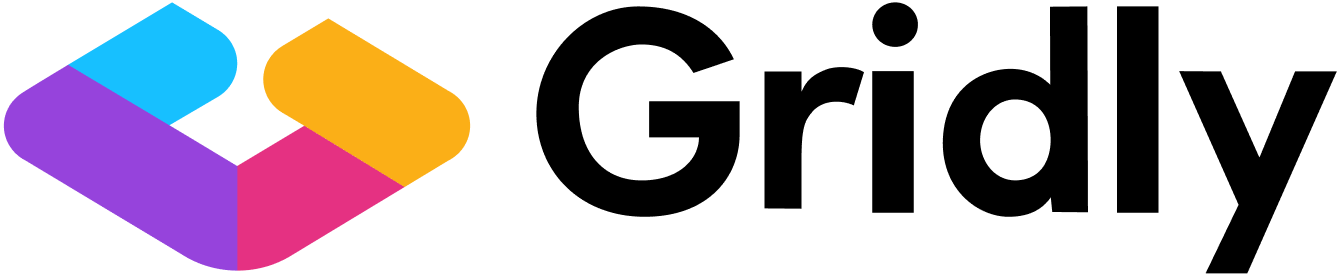
- Founded: 2022
- Founder: Christoffer Nilsson Mattias Wennerholm
- Headquarters: Helsingborg, Sweden
- Area served: Worldwide
- Key people: Anna Albinsson (CEO) Christoffer Nilsson (CPO) Mattias Wennerholm (CTO)
- Products: Localization platform
- Number of employees: 50+
- Website: gridly.com

Gridly is a localization platform for software and game companies to manage and translate digital content using AI, automations, bulk operations, and translator tools. Gridly is developed by the Swedish company also named Gridly.

Anna Albinsson is CEO of the company.

== History ==
The Gridly platform was initially developed in 2020 by LocalizeDirect, a Swedish localization company founded in 2009 by Christoffer Nilsson and Mattias Wennerholm, both former game developers. LocalizeDirect raised $1.1 million in funding in July 2020 to launch Gridly as a headless content management system for video game localization.

In 2022, Nilsson and Wennerholm established Gridly as an independent company to focus on developing the platform. The company's headquarter is located in Helsingborg, Sweden. In April 2024, Gridly completed a $2.6 million seed funding round led by Nordic B2B software investor Subvenio Invest and US-based digital media specialist Rendered.VC, with participation from a global games company and existing investors. In November 2024, Anna Albinsson was appointed CEO, while co-founder Christoffer Nilsson transitioned to Chief Product Officer. In March 2025, Gridly launched TMS and CAT features, completing their transition to a centralized localization platform. In June 2026, Gridly secured $1.4 million in fresh funding across two investment rounds, backed by strategic investors including Jörgen Larsson, founder and former CEO of Stillfront Group.

== Business model and customer base ==
Gridly operates under a B2B SaaS subscription model. The platform offers tiered pricing based on feature sets and user seats, with annual billing options. The platform serves more than 130 customers across the gaming, FinTech, MedTech, and other software industries, including Rovio, Scopely, Belka Games, and Warner Bros. Games.

== Product features and integrations ==
Gridly's platform capabilities have grown since its original launch in 2020. The Gridly platform initially functioned as a content management system (CMS) designed for managing multilingual content in game development projects. The platform provided tools for organizing, tracking, and managing digital assets (such as text, images, audio, and videos) across multiple languages, including features such as Grids, dependencies, and CDN. Other features include version control, collaborative editing, localization quality assurance, and automations.

In March 2025, Gridly expanded its platform to include translation management system (TMS) and computer-assisted translation (CAT) modules. The TMS module enables project managers to create translation jobs, assign tasks to translators, and track progress, while the CAT module provides translators with tools including translation memory, terminology management, AI suggestions, and quality assurance features.

The Gridly platform integrates with various development tools and software, including Figma, memoQ, and WPML, as well as game engines such as Unity and Unreal Engine.

== Awards and nominations ==
Gridly was nominated for Best Gaas Tools & Tech in 2023 and Best Tool Provider in 2025 by the Pocket Gamer Mobile Games Awards.
