= Localization Industry Standards Association =

Trade association based in Switzerland

Localization Industry Standards Association or LISA was a Swiss-based trade body concerning the translation of computer software (and associated materials) into multiple natural languages, which existed from 1990 to February 2011. It counted among its members most of the large information technology companies of the period, including Adobe, Cisco, Hewlett-Packard, IBM, McAfee, Nokia, Novell and Xerox.

LISA played a significant role in representing its partners at the International Organization for Standardization (ISO), and the TermBase eXchange (TBX) standard developed by LISA was submitted to ISO in 2007 and became ISO 30042:2008. LISA also had a presence at the W3C.

A number of the LISA standards are used by the OASIS Open Architecture for XML Authoring and Localization framework.

LISA shut down on 28 February 2011, and its website went offline shortly afterwards. In the wake of the closure of LISA, the European Telecommunications Standards Institute started an Industry Specification Group (ISG) for localization. The ISG has five work items:

- Term-Base eXchange (TBX) / ISO 30042:2008
- Translation Memory eXchange (TMX), with GALA
- Segmentation Rules eXchange (SRX) / ISO/CD 24621)
- Global information management Metrics eXchange – Volume (GMX-V);

Another organization that was formed in response to the closure of LISA is Terminology for Large Organizations (TerminOrgs), a consortium of terminology professionals who promote terminology management best practices.
