= TermBase eXchange =

International standard for terminology exchange

- Filename extension: .tbx
- Internet media type: application/x-tbx
- UTI conformation: public.xml
- Developed by: Localization Industry Standards Association
- Initial release: 2002?
- Latest release: April 2019; 7 years ago
- Type of format: Terminology
- Extended from: XML
- Standard: ISO 30042
- Open format?: yes
- Website: https://www.tbxinfo.net/

TermBase eXchange (TBX) is an international standard (ISO 30042:2019) for the representation of structured concept-oriented terminological data, copublished by ISO and the Localization Industry Standards Association (LISA). Originally released in 2002 by LISA's OSCAR special interest group, TBX was adopted by ISO TC 37 in 2008. In 2019 ISO 30042:2008 was withdrawn and revised by ISO 30042:2019. It is currently available as an ISO standard and as an open, industry standard, available at no charge.

TBX defines an XML format for the exchange of terminology data, and is "an industry standard for terminology exchange".

== See also ==
- IATE (“Inter-Active Terminology for Europe”) is the EU's inter-institutional terminology database used in the EU institutions and agencies since summer 2004 for the collection, dissemination and shared management of EU-specific terminology. The IATE multilingual databases can be downloaded in a zipped format, then multilanguage glossaries in TBX format can be generated using a free tool.
- OpenTMS (Open Source Translation Management System)
- XLIFF (XML Localisation Interchange File Format): an XML-based format created to standardize the way localizable data are passed between tools during a localization process and a common format for CAT tool files.
- GlossML: an XML-based format for representing bilingual and multilingual glossaries, storing source and target terms along with definitions and contextual examples. TBX-Glossary, a restricted dialect of TBX designed for cross-format interchange, supports lossless conversion to and from GlossML.
