= Segmentation Rules eXchange =

Segmentation Rules eXchange or SRX is an XML-based standard that was maintained by Localization Industry Standards Association, until it became insolvent in 2011, and then by the Globalization and Localization Association (GALA).

SRX provides a common way to describe how to segment text for translation and other language-related processes. It was created when it was realized that TMX was less useful than expected in certain instances due to differences in how tools segment text. SRX is intended to enhance the TMX standard so that translation memory (TM) data that is exchanged between applications can be used more effectively. Having the segmentation rules available that were used when a TM was created increases the usefulness of the TM data.

== Implementation difficulties ==
SRX make use of the ICU Regular Expression syntax, but not all programming languages support all ICU expressions, making implementing SRX in some languages difficult or impossible. Java is an example of this.

== Version history ==
SRX version 1.0 was officially accepted as an OSCAR standard in April 2004.

SRX version 2.0 was officially accepted as an OSCAR standard in April 2008.

SRX forms part of the Open Architecture for XML Authoring and Localization (OAXAL) reference architecture.
