= Weblate =

Web-based translation software and associated organization

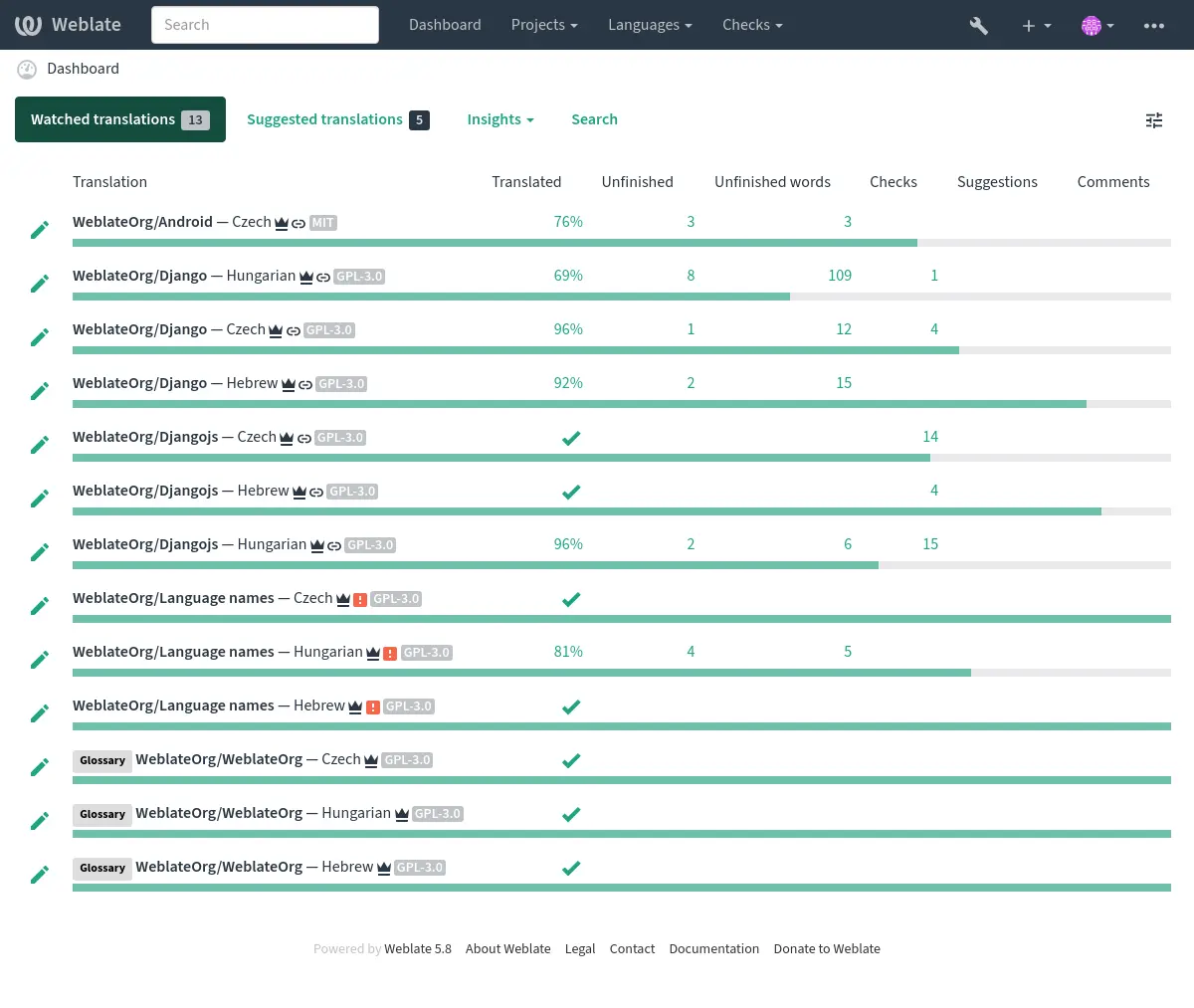
- Original author: Michal Čihař
- Developer: github/weblate
- Initial release: March 2012; 14 years ago
- Stable release: 5.15.2 / 14 January 2026; 2 months ago
- Written in: Python
- Operating system: Cross-platform
- Platform: Web
- Available in: 108 languages
- List of languages Abkhazian, Afrihili, Albanian, Arabic, Arabic (Libya), Arabic (Najdi), Armenian, Asturian, Azerbaijani, Basque, Belarusian, Belarusian (Latin), Bengali, Bengali (Bangladesh), Berber, Breton, Bulgarian, Burmese, Catalan, Chechen, Chinese (Literary), Chinese (Simplified), Chinese (Traditional), Chuvash, Colognian, Crimean Tatar, Croatian, Czech, Danish, Dhivehi, Dutch, English (Middle), English (Old), English (United Kingdom), Esperanto, Estonian, Filipino, Finnish, Frisian, Friulian, Galician, Georgian, German, Greek, Hebrew, Hindi, Hungarian, Indonesian, Interlingua, Italian, Japanese, Kabyle, Kazakh, Khmer (Central), Klingon, Korean, Kurdish (Central), Kurdish (Northern), Latvian, Lingala, Lithuanian, Macedonian, Malay, Malayalam, Marathi, Norwegian Bokmål, Norwegian Nynorsk, Occidental, Occitan, Odia, Pashto, Persian, Persian (Old), Polish, Portuguese, Portuguese (brazil), Portuguese (Portugal), Punjabi, Punjabi (Pakistan), Romanian, Russian, Sardinian, Serbian, Serbian (Latin), Sinhala, Slovak, Slovenian, Spanish, Swahili, Swedish, Tamazight (Central Atlas), Tamazight (Standard Moroccan), Tamil, Tatar, Telugu, Thai, Tibetan, Toki Pona, Turkish, Ukrainian, Uyghur, Uzbek, Vietnamese, Welsh, Yue
- Type: Computer-assisted translation
- License: GNU GPLv3+
- Website: weblate.org
- Repository: github.com/WeblateOrg/weblate

Weblate is an open source web-based translation tool with version control. It includes several hundred languages with basic definitions, and enables the addition of more language definitions, all definitions can be edited by the web community or a defined set of people, as well as through integrating machine translation, such as DeepL Translator, Amazon Translate, or Google Translate.

== Stated goals ==
Weblate aims to facilitate web-based translation with tight Git integration for a wide range of file formats, helping translators contribute without knowledge of Git workflow.

Translations closely follow development, as they are hosted within the same repository as the source code. There is no plan for heavy conflict resolution, as it is argued these should primarily be handled on the Git side.

== Project name ==
The project's name is a portmanteau of words web and translate.

== Notable uses ==
These are some projects using Weblate:

- Godot Engine
- Blender
- FreePBX
- OsmAnd
- phpMyAdmin
- Organic Maps
- Unknown Horizons
- OpenPetra
- Turris Omnia
- Debian Handbook
- LibreOffice and Collabora Online
- Monero
- openSUSE
- Open Journal Systems
- H5P
- Kodi
- ParaView
- Zulip

== See also ==
- Translate Toolkit
- Translation memory
- Computer-assisted translation
