= Internationalization and localization =

Process of making software accessible worldwide

In computing, internationalization and localization (American) or internationalisation and localisation (Commonwealth), often abbreviated i18n and l10n respectively, are means of adapting to different languages, regional peculiarities and technical requirements of a target locale.

Internationalization is the process of designing a software application so that it can be adapted to various languages and regions without engineering changes. Localization is the process of adapting internationalized software for a specific region or language by translating text and adding locale-specific components.

Localization (which is potentially performed multiple times, for different locales) uses the infrastructure or flexibility provided by internationalization (which is ideally performed only once before localization, or as an integral part of ongoing development).

== Naming ==
The terms are frequently abbreviated to the numeronyms i18n (where 18 stands for the number of letters between the first i and the last n in the word internationalization, a usage coined at Digital Equipment Corporation in the 1970s or 1980s) and l10n for localization, due to the length of the words. Some writers have the latter term capitalized (L10n) to help distinguish the two.

Some companies, like IBM and Oracle, use the term globalization, g11n, for the combination of internationalization and localization.

Microsoft defines internationalization as a combination of world-readiness and localization. World-readiness is a developer task, which enables a product to be used with multiple scripts and cultures (globalization) and separates user interface resources in a localizable format (localizability, abbreviated to L12y).

Hewlett-Packard and HP-UX created a system called "National Language Support" or "Native Language Support" (NLS) to produce localizable software.

Some vendors, including IBM use the term National Language Version (NLV) for localized versions of software products supporting only one specific locale. The term implies the existence of other alike NLV versions of the software for different markets; this terminology is not used where no internationalization and localization was undertaken and a software product only supports one language and locale in any version.

== Scope ==
The internationalization and localization process (based on a chart from the LISA website)

According to Software without frontiers, the design aspects to consider when internationalizing a product are "data encoding, data and documentation, software construction, hardware device support, and user interaction"; while the key design areas to consider when making a fully internationalized product from scratch are "user interaction, algorithm design and data formats, software services, and documentation".

Translation is typically the most time-consuming component of language localization. This may involve:

- For film, video, and audio, translation of spoken words or music lyrics, often using either dubbing or subtitles
- Text translation for printed materials, and digital media (possibly including error messages and documentation)
- Potentially altering images and logos containing text to contain translations or generic icons
- Different translation lengths and differences in character sizes (e.g. between Latin alphabet letters and Chinese characters) can cause layouts that work well in one language to work poorly in others
- Consideration of differences in dialect, register or variety
- Writing conventions like:
  - Formatting of numbers (especially decimal separator and digit grouping)
  - Date and time format, possibly including the use of different calendars (e.g. the Islamic or the Japanese calendar)
- Representation conventions (e.g. in CAD software) like:
  - Projected 3D views (first-angle, third-angle)
  - Title blocks
  - Dimension styles
- Other aspects of the product or service that must comply with legal regulations (e.g. accounting) and local technical standards

=== Standard locale data ===
Computer software can encounter differences above and beyond straightforward translation of words and phrases, because computer programs can generate content dynamically. These differences may need to be taken into account by the internationalization process in preparation for translation. Many of these differences are so regular that a conversion between languages can be easily automated. The Common Locale Data Repository by Unicode provides a collection of such differences. Its data is used by major operating systems, including Microsoft Windows, macOS and Debian, and by major Internet companies or projects such as Google and the Wikimedia Foundation. Examples of such differences include:

- Different "scripts" in different writing systems use different characters – a different set of letters, syllograms, logograms, or symbols. Modern systems use the Unicode standard to represent many different languages with a single character encoding.
- Writing direction is left to right in most European languages, right-to-left in Hebrew and Arabic, or both in boustrophedon scripts, and optionally vertical in some Asian languages.
- Complex text layout, for languages where characters change shape depending on context
- Capitalization exists in some scripts and not in others
- Different languages and writing systems have different text sorting rules
- Different languages have different numeral systems, which might need to be supported if Western Arabic numerals are not used
- Different languages have different pluralization rules, which can complicate programs that dynamically display numerical content. Other grammar rules might also vary, e.g. genitive.
- Different languages use different punctuation (e.g. quoting text using double-quotes (" ") as in English, or guillemets (« ») as in French)
- Keyboard shortcuts can only make use of buttons on the keyboard layout which is being localized for. If a shortcut corresponds to a word in a particular language (e.g. Ctrl-s stands for "save" in English), it may need to be changed.

=== National conventions ===
Different countries have different economic conventions, including variations in:

- Paper sizes
- Broadcast television systems and popular storage media
- Telephone number formats
- Postal address formats, postal codes, and choice of delivery services
- Currency (symbols, positions of currency markers, and reasonable amounts due to different inflation histories) – ISO 4217 codes are often used for internationalization
- System of measurement
- Battery sizes
- Voltage and current standards

In particular, the United States and Europe differ in most of these cases. Other areas often follow one of these.

Specific third-party services, such as online maps, weather reports, or payment service providers, might not be available worldwide from the same carriers, or at all.

Time zones vary across the world, and this must be taken into account if a product originally only interacted with people in a single time zone. For internationalization, UTC is often used internally and then converted into a local time zone for display purposes.

Different countries have different legal requirements, meaning for example:

- Regulatory compliance may require customization for a particular jurisdiction, or a change to the product as a whole, such as:
  - Privacy law compliance
  - Additional disclaimers on a website or packaging
  - Different consumer labelling requirements
  - Compliance with export restrictions and regulations on encryption
  - Compliance with an Internet censorship regime or subpoena procedures
  - Requirements for accessibility
  - Collecting different taxes, such as sales tax, value added tax, or customs duties
  - Sensitivity to different political issues, like geographical naming disputes and disputed borders shown on maps (e.g., India has proposed a bill that would make failing to show Kashmir and other areas as intended by the government a crime)
- Government-assigned numbers have different formats (such as passports, Social Security Numbers and other national identification numbers)

Localization also may take into account differences in culture, such as:

- Local holidays
- Personal name and title conventions
- Aesthetics
- Comprehensibility and cultural appropriateness of images and color symbolism
- Ethnicity, clothing, and socioeconomic status of people and architecture of locations pictured
- Local customs and conventions, such as social taboos, popular local religions, or superstitions such as blood types in Japanese culture vs. astrological signs in other cultures

== Business process for internationalizing software ==
To internationalize a product, it is important to look at a variety of markets that the product will foreseeably enter. Details such as field length for street addresses, unique format for the address, ability to make the postal code field optional to address countries that do not have postal codes or the state field for countries that do not have states, plus the introduction of new registration flows that adhere to local laws are just some of the examples that make internationalization a complex project. A broader approach takes into account cultural factors regarding for example the adaptation of the business process logic or the inclusion of individual cultural (behavioral) aspects.

Already in the 1990s, companies such as Bull used machine translation (Systran) on a large scale, for all their translation activity: human translators handled pre-editing (making the input machine-readable) and post-editing.

== Engineering ==
Both in re-engineering an existing software or designing a new internationalized software, the first step of internationalization is to split each potentially locale-dependent part (whether code, text or data) into a separate module. Each module can then either rely on a standard library/dependency or be independently replaced as needed for each locale.

The current prevailing practice is for applications to place text in resource files which are loaded during program execution as needed. These strings, stored in resource files, are relatively easy to translate. Programs are often built to reference resource libraries depending on the selected locale data.

The storage for translatable and translated strings is sometimes called a message catalog as the strings are called messages. The catalog generally comprises a set of files in a specific localization format and a standard library to handle said format. One software library and format that aids this is gettext.

Thus to get an application to support multiple languages one would design the application to select the relevant language resource file at runtime. The code required to manage data entry verification and many other locale-sensitive data types also must support differing locale requirements. Modern development systems and operating systems include sophisticated libraries for international support of these types, see also Standard locale data above.

Many localization issues (e.g. writing direction, text sorting) require more profound changes in the software than text translation. For example, OpenOffice.org achieves this with compilation switches.

== Process ==
A globalization method includes, after planning, three implementation steps: internationalization, localization and quality assurance.

To some degree (e.g. for quality assurance), development teams include someone who handles the basic/central stages of the process which then enables all the others. Such persons typically understand foreign languages and cultures and have some technical background. Specialized technical writers are required to construct a culturally appropriate syntax for potentially complicated concepts, coupled with engineering resources to deploy and test the localization elements.

Once properly internationalized, software can rely on more decentralized models for localization: free and open source software usually rely on self-localization by end-users and volunteers, sometimes organized in teams. The GNOME project, for example, has volunteer translation teams for over 100 languages. MediaWiki supports over 500 languages, of which 100 are mostly complete as of September 2023.

When translating existing text to other languages, it is difficult to maintain the parallel versions of texts throughout the life of the product. For instance, if a message displayed to the user is modified, all of the translated versions must be changed.

Independent software vendors such as Microsoft may provides reference software localization guidelines for developers. The software localization language may be different from the written language.

== Commercial considerations ==
In a commercial setting, the benefit of localization is access to more markets. In the early 1980s, Lotus 1-2-3 took two years to separate program code and text and lost the market lead in Europe over Microsoft Multiplan. By 1985 about a quarter of Ashton-Tate's $80 million in annual sales came from outside the United States; the company localized its products in 11 European languages. MicroPro found that using an Austrian translator for the West German market caused its WordStar documentation to, an executive said, not "have the tone it should have had". When Tandy Corporation needed French and German translations of English error messages for the TRS-80 Model 4, the company's Belgium office and five translators in the US produced six different versions that varied depending on the gender of computer components.

However, there are considerable costs involved, which go far beyond engineering. Further, business operations must adapt to manage the production, storage and distribution of multiple discrete localized products, which are often being sold in completely different currencies, regulatory environments and tax regimes.

Finally, sales, marketing and technical support must also facilitate their operations in the new languages, to support customers for the localized products. Particularly for relatively small language populations, it may never be economically viable to offer a localized product. Even where large language populations could justify localization for a given product, and a product's internal structure already permits localization, a given software developer or publisher may lack the size and sophistication to manage the ancillary functions associated with operating in multiple locales.

== Examples and counterexamples ==
One example of the pitfalls of localization is the attempt made by Microsoft to keep some keyboard shortcuts significant in local languages. This has resulted in some (but not all) programs in the Italian version of Microsoft Office using "CTRL + S" (sottolineato) as a replacement for "CTRL + U" (underline), rather than the (almost) universal "Save" function. Before the advent of 'AutoSave', the net result could be a lot of underlined words in an unsaved revision of the document.

The team responsible for Microsoft Excel localization decided to translate the tokens used in formulas, as a byproduct of localizing number and date formats. For example, =SUM(A1:A10) becomes =SOMME(A1:A10) in French or =SUMME(A1:A10) in German.

While making the formulas easier to understand for users with no knowledge of the English language, it has also meant that, before machine translation of web pages, a search for help on the internet could not count on examples from other languages. Manuals and tutorials required translations of every formula in examples and exercises.

== See also ==
- Subcomponents and standards:
  - Bidirectional script support
  - International Components for Unicode
  - Language code
  - Language localization
  - Website localization
- Related concepts:
  - Computer accessibility
  - Computer Russification, localization into Russian language
  - Separation of concerns
- Methods and examples:
  - Game localization
  - Translation management system
  - Pseudolocalization, a software testing method for testing a software product's readiness for localization.
- Other:
  - Input method editor
  - Language industry
