= Language localisation =

Product Management Discipline

Language localisation (or language localization) is the process of adapting a product's translation to a specific country or region. It is the second phase of a larger process of product translation and cultural adaptation (for specific countries, regions, cultures or groups) to account for differences in distinct markets, a process known as internationalisation and localisation.

Language localisation differs from translation activity because it involves a comprehensive study of the target culture in order to correctly adapt the product to local needs. Localisation can be referred to by the numeronym L10N (as in: "L", followed by the number 10, and then "N").

The localisation process is most generally related to the cultural adaptation and translation of software, mobile applications, video games, websites, and technical communication, as well as audio/voiceover, video, writing system, script or other multimedia content, and less frequently to any written translation (which may also involve cultural adaptation processes).

Localisation can be done for regions or countries where people speak different languages or where the same language is spoken. For instance, different dialects of German, with different idioms, are spoken in Germany, Austria, Switzerland, and Belgium.

== The overall process: internationalisation, globalisation, and localisation ==
The former Localization Industry Standards Association (LISA) said that globalisation "can best be thought of as a cycle rather than a single process". To globalise is to plan the design and development methods for a product in advance, keeping in mind a multicultural audience, in order to avoid increased costs and quality problems, save time, and smooth the localising effort for each region or country.

The globalisation process (based on a chart from the LISA website)

There are two primary technical processes that comprise globalisation: internationalisation and localisation.

The first phase, internationalisation, encompasses the planning and preparation stages for a product built to support global markets. This process removes all cultural assumptions, and country- or language-specific content is stored so that it can be easily adapted. If this content is not separated during this phase, it must be fixed during localisation, adding time and expense to the project. In extreme cases, products that are not internationalised may not be localisable. Internationalization is often written as 'i18n' in the localization industry, where the number 18 is the number of letters between i and n in the English word.

The second phase, localisation, refers to the actual adaptation of the product for a specific market. The localisation phase involves, among other things, the four issues LISA describes as linguistic, physical, business and cultural, and technical issues. Localization is sometimes written as 'l10n', where the number 10 refers to the number of letters between l and n.

At the end of each phase, testing (including quality assurance) is performed to ensure that the product works properly and meets the client's quality expectations.

=== Translation versus localisation ===
Though it is sometimes difficult to draw the limits between translation and localisation, in general localisation addresses significant, non-textual components of products or services. In addition to translation (and, therefore, grammar and spelling issues that vary from place to place where the same language is spoken), the localisation process might include adapting graphics; adopting local currencies; using proper format for date and time, addresses, and phone numbers applicable to the location; the choices of colours; cultural references; and many other details, including rethinking the physical structure of a product. All these changes aim to recognise local sensitivities; avoid conflict with local culture, customs, and common habits; and enter the local market by merging into its needs and desires. To sum up, localisation always starts with a translation process followed by adaptations regarding linguistic and cultural factors.

For example, localisation aims to offer country-specific websites of the same company or different editions of a book depending on where it is published. It must be kept in mind that a political entity such as a country is not the same as a language or culture; even in countries where there exists a substantially identical relationship between a language and a political entity, there are almost certainly multiple cultures and multiple minority languages even if the minority languages are spoken by transient populations. For instance, Japan's national language is Japanese and is the primary language for over 99% of the population, but the country also recognises 11 languages officially; others are spoken by transient populations, and others yet are spoken as second or other languages.

=== Globalisation versus localisation ===
Whereas localisation is the process of adapting one product to a particular locale, globalisation designs the product to minimise the extra work required for each localisation.

Suppose that a company operating exclusively in Germany chooses to open a major office in Russia and needs a Russian-language website. The company offers the same products and services in both countries with minor differences, but perhaps some elements that appeared in the original website intended for a German audience are offensive or upsetting in Russia (use of flags, colours, nationalistic images, songs, etc.). Thus, that company might lose a potential market because of small details of presentation.

Furthermore, this company might need to adapt the product to its new buyers; video games are the best example.

Now, suppose instead that this company has major offices in a dozen countries and needs a specifically designed website in each of these countries. Before deciding how to localise the website and the products offered in any given country, a professional in the area might advise the company to create an overall strategy: to globalise the way the organisation does business. The company might want to design a framework to codify and support this global strategy. The globalisation strategy and the globalisation framework would provide uniform guidance for the twelve separate localisation efforts.

Globalisation is especially important in mitigating extra work involved in the long-term cycle of localisation. Because localisation is usually a cycle and not a one-time project, there are new texts, updates, and projects to localise. For example, as the original website is updated over time, each already translated and localised website must be updated. This work cycle is continuous as long as the original project continues to evolve. A streamlined globalisation processes is therefore important for ongoing changes.

== Localisation technology ==
The use of technology has developed into an important aspect of translation and localization. The industry now holds a strong preference for the use of technology in the translation, editing, and proofreading process as it provides major benefits in project management workflow automation, terminology consistency, quality assurance. The most commonly used language technologies include:

- Translation Management Systems (TMS)
- Computer Aided/Assisted Translation (CAT)
- Machine Translation (MT)
- Translation Memory (TM)
- Content Management Systems (CMS) with APIs

A Translation Management System (TMS) is a software program that supports the organization and facilitation of translation and localisation projects. A localisation project usually involves multiple individuals often located in different locales, this makes the TMS a necessary tool in piecing together everyone's efforts. The TMS provides organization and automation to the project management workflow, collects project data, generates reports, and integrates necessary elements such as machine translation (MT), translation memory (TM), and sometimes provides access to quality assurance tools.

In essence, the TMS provides a workbench for all the necessary tools involved in a successful translation and localization operation.

== Language tags and codes ==
Language codes are closely related to the localising process because they indicate the locales involved in the translation and adaptation of the product. They are used in various contexts; for example, they might be informally used in a document published by the European Union or they might be introduced in HTML element under the lang attribute. In the case of the European Union style guide, the language codes are based on the ISO 639-1 alpha-2 code; in HTML, the language tags are generally defined within the Internet Engineering Task Force's Best Current Practice (BCP) 47. (Note: BCP is a persistent name for a series of IETF Request for Comments (RFCs) whose numbers change as they are updated. As of 2015-05-28, the latest included RFC about the principles of language tags is RFC 5646, Tags for the Identification of Languages.) The decision to use one type of code or tag versus another depends upon the nature of the project and any requirements set out for the localisation specialist.

Most frequently, there is a primary subcode that identifies the language (e.g., "en"), and an optional subcode in capital letters that specifies the national variety (e.g., "GB" or "US" according to ISO 3166-1 alpha-2). The subcodes are typically linked with a hyphen, though in some contexts it's necessary to substitute this with an underscore.

There are multiple language tag systems available for language codification. For example, the International Organization for Standardization (ISO) specifies both two- and three-letter codes to represent languages in standards ISO 639-1 and ISO 639-2, respectively.

Examples of language tags
Language family	Language tag	Language variant
Arabic	ar-DZ	Algerian Arabic
Arabic	ar-EG	Egyptian Arabic
Arabic	ar-IQ	Arabic (Iraq)
Arabic	ar-MA	Moroccan Arabic
Arabic	ar-SA	Saudi Arabian Arabic
Arabic	ar-AE	Arabic (United Arab Emirates)
Bangla	bn-BD	Bangla (Bangladesh)
Bangla	bn-IN	Bangla (India)
Chinese	zh-CN	Mainland China, simplified characters
Chinese	zh-TW	Taiwan, traditional characters
Chinese	zh-HK	Hong Kong, traditional characters
Dutch	nl-BE	Belgian Dutch (aka Flemish)
Dutch	nl-NL	Standard Dutch (as spoken in The Netherlands)
English	en-GB	British English
English	en-US	American English
English	en-CA	Canadian English
English	en-IN	Indian English
English	en-IE	Irish English
English	en-AU	Australian English
English	en-NZ	New Zealand English
English	en-ZA	South African English
English	en-SG	Singapore English
French	fr-BE	Belgian French
French	fr-CH	Swiss French
French	fr-FR	French of France
French	fr-CA	Canadian French, including Quebec French
French	fr-LU	Luxembourgish French
German	de-AT	Austrian German
German	de-DE	Standard German (as spoken in Germany)
German	de-CH	Swiss German
Italian	it-CH	Swiss Italian
Italian	it-IT	Standard Italian (as spoken in Italy)
Korean	ko-KP	North Korea, Chosŏn'gŭl characters
Korean	ko-KR	South Korea, Hangul characters
Portuguese	pt-PT	European Portuguese (as written and spoken in Portugal)
Portuguese	pt-BR	Brazilian Portuguese
Portuguese	pt-AO	Angolan Portuguese
Portuguese	pt-MZ	Mozambican Portuguese
Sinhala	si-LK	Sri Lankan Sinhala
Spanish	es-ES	Castilian Spanish (as spoken in Central-Northern Spain)
Spanish	es-MX	Mexican Spanish
Spanish	es-AR	Argentine Spanish
Spanish	es-CO	Colombian Spanish
Spanish	es-CL	Chilean Spanish
Spanish	es-PE	Peruvian Spanish
Spanish	es-VE	Venezuelan Spanish
Spanish	es-DO	Dominican Spanish
Spanish	es-CU	Cuban Spanish
Swedish	sv-FI	Finland Swedish
Swedish	sv-SE	Standard Swedish (as spoken in Sweden)
Tamil	ta-IN	Indian Tamil
Tamil	ta-LK	Sri Lankan Tamil
Tamazight	zgh-MA	Standard Moroccan Tamazight

== Brief History: Roles in the Localization Industry ==
=== Manual Beginnings (1980s–1990s) ===
Localisation started mainly as manual translation and content adaptation for software and documentation. Projects were labour-intensive with basic translation workflows and no formalized industry roles. Early work was done by translators and engineers pieced together on a case-by-case basis.

International software companies began setting up in-house localisation teams to adapt products for non-home markets, still with heavy human effort.

=== Standardization and Early Industry Roles (1990s–2000s) ===
As translation studies began to intersect with technical localisation, scholarly work helped define software localisation, web localisation, and later, multimedia and game localisation as distinct areas of practice.

Dedicated roles such as project managers and localisation engineers emerged to handle workflow coordination and technical adaptation of software strings.

=== Technology and Globalization (2000s–2010s) ===
With globalization accelerating, professional translation and localisation services scaled up. Tools like translation memory and early TMS systems started shaping new specialist roles.

Localisation teams grew to include roles that bridged linguistic, cultural, technical, and project work.

=== Automation and Product Strategy (2010s–present) ===
Modern roles now incorporate technology: AI/ML-assisted translation, automation, and continuous localization workflows.

Strategic roles (e.g., Directors of International Product, Heads of Globalization) tie localization directly to business goals, not just translation output. This is noted transition from previous functions in the industry.

== See also ==
- American and British English differences
- Globalization
- Internationalization and localization
- Spanish dialects and varieties
- Transcreation
- Translation
- Variety (linguistics)
- Website localization
- Indigenization
