= Translation Memory eXchange =

File format

Translation Memory eXchange (TMX) is an XML specification for the exchange of translation memory (TM) data between computer-aided translation and localization tools with little or no loss of critical data.

TMX was originally developed and maintained by OSCAR (Open Standards for Container/Content Allowing Re-use), a special interest group of LISA (Localization Industry Standards Association), and first released in 1997. Specification 1.4b of 2005 remained current as of 2020. It allows the original source and target documents to be recreated from the TMX data. A working draft of TMX 2.0 was released for public comment in March 2007 but no work was done on the new version; in March 2011 LISA was declared insolvent and as a result its standards were moved under a Creative Commons license and the standards specification relocated.

TMX forms part of the Open Architecture for XML Authoring and Localization (OAXAL) reference architecture.

== Example ==
An example of a TMX document with one entry:

<tmx version="1.4">
  <header
    creationtool="XYZTool" creationtoolversion="1.01-023"
    datatype="PlainText" segtype="sentence"
    adminlang="en-us" srclang="en"
    o-tmf="ABCTransMem"/>
  <body>
    <tu>
      <tuv xml:lang="en">
        <seg>Hello world!</seg>
      </tuv>
      <tuv xml:lang="fr">
        <seg>Bonjour tout le monde!</seg>
      </tuv>
    </tu>
  </body>
</tmx>
