= Sega Studios San Francisco =

American video game developer

- Formerly: Secret Level, Inc.
- Type: Division
- Industry: Video games
- Founded: 1999; 27 years ago (Secret Level, Inc.)
- Founder: Jeremy Gordon; Josh Adams; Otavio Good
- Defunct: 2010; 16 years ago
- Fate: Dissolved
- Headquarters: San Francisco, California, U.S.
- Key people: Constantine Hantzopolous; Jeremy Gordon; Reeve Thompson; Christopher Bretz; Jeffrey Tseng; Angus Chassels; Paul Forest; David Dienstbier
- Products: Iron Man series; Golden Axe: Beast Rider
- Parent: Sega (2006–2010)

Sega Studios San Francisco, formerly known as Secret Level, Inc., was an American video game developer based in San Francisco, California. It was founded in December 1999 by Jeremy Gordon, Otavio Good, and Josh Adams.

== History ==
Secret Level logo

Before being purchased by Sega, Secret Level, Inc. was a small game development studio. The company ported and developed original game titles, and was also known for their tools and technology expertise. The company took on a wide variety of work for hire projects that focused on either art or programming. The company developed several commercial tools for authoring game UI and menus. They also had a long time relationship with Epic Games for bringing the Unreal Engine to several game consoles. During its lifetime the studio developed games for Dreamcast, PC, PlayStation 2, PlayStation 3, PSP, Xbox, and Xbox 360.

The company was originally divided into three separate legal entities; Secret Level Games, Secret Level Tools, and Secret Level Technology. This was a reflection of the company's business model for achieving developmental stability. Each group was to have its own income streams. The divisions were later merged a few years into the studio's operation.

Founder Jeremy Gordon was the Studio Director and CTO from 1999 to 2009.

Secret Level's first game release was Unreal Tournament for the Sega Dreamcast, a port of the PC game by Epic Games. The game had additional content created and work done to increase its appeal to a console audience. The reception was excellent and the game received an Editor's Choice Award from IGN. The game also began a longtime relationship between Epic and Secret Level, with the latter supporting Unreal Engine technology on the PlayStation 2 and GameCube for several years. Secret Level wrote the first Unreal export tools for Maya in 2002.

Secret Level Tools developed Strobe: Flash for Games SDK as a UI solution for game developers in 2000. The product was used in several LucasArts titles which began a relationship which led to the Starfighter game ports. The product was suspended in mid 2001.

The company was hired by LucasArts to port Star Wars: Starfighter to the Xbox in 2001. The game was titled Star Wars: Starfighter: Special Edition and featured new content, new playable ships, and added detail to the levels. This was followed up with Star Wars: Jedi Starfighter for Xbox which featured even more Secret Level generated content, including additional game modes, and a new Coruscant game level.

Secret Level's first original game was Magic: The Gathering - Battlegrounds released in November 2003 by Atari. The project brought the classic Wizards of the Coast Magic: The Gathering trading card game to the Xbox and PC in full 3D. It was designed with faithful translations of classic creatures, spells, and enchantments for real-time strategic duelling. The company used the game as an opportunity to grow its art department significantly.

The company signed up to do America's Army: Rise of a Soldier in early 2004 for Ubisoft. It was an Xbox version of the tactical first-person shooter America's Army, released by the U.S. Army in 2002 as a communications and recruiting tool. The new game added a story and levels to appeal more broadly to a console audience. The game also included a new single player mode based on Major Jason Amerine's experiences in Afghanistan in the year 2001. The company used the game as an opportunity to grow its game design department significantly. Secret Level was unable to get an acceptable frame rate for the PS2 version of the game and that release was canceled in late 2005.

The company took on a number of work for hire projects over the years (see below) which tasked either the art or engineering departments. During the period 2004-2006 there were over half a dozen small projects.

Secret Level joined the Khronos Group in May 2004.

The company completed a port of Karaoke Revolution to the Xbox for Konami in late 2004. It was the first karaoke video game for the Xbox to include a vocal analyzer that measures the pitch and rhythm of a player's voice. It received IGN Editor's Choice Award.

In September 2004, Secret Level moved from its long time San Francisco offices in the Flood Building at 870 Market Street, to larger ones at 123 Townsend Street, across from AT&T Park.

Secret Level became Ageia's first NovodeX solution development house in March 2005. The art department produced demo material for the technology.

Founder Josh Adams left the company in mid 2005 to join Epic Games. The company released Sidecar in late 2005, an SDK and authoring environment for game UI and menus. Orange Design, who had used Strobe several years earlier on the Starfighter projects, worked with Secret Level to complete the UI for X-Men: The Official Movie Game. The game shipped in March 2006.

Secret Level began work on Golden Axe in summer 2005 for Sega and rapidly made progress with development of both the game and a new game engine. Sega was so impressed it decided to acquire the studio.

=== Sega buyout ===
On April 3, 2006, Secret Level, Inc. was acquired by Sega, for $15 million. Sega had recently started acquiring other studios in an effort to build more western appeal, and this was its first North American purchase. VP Operations Angus Chassels left Secret Level after the buyout to pursue other opportunities. Chassels is currently the first full-time Entrepreneur in Residence at the University of Colorado.

After the acquisition, Secret Level was grown to a large, nearly 200 person studio and became Sega Studios San Francisco. The company developed Iron Man, Iron Man 2, and Golden Axe: Beast Rider for the PlayStation 3 and Xbox 360. This required that the studio grow quickly, nearly doubling its size in less than a year. This certainly affected the quality of the final products as hiring, particularly of key positions, was slower than needed.

Founders Jeremy Gordon and Otavio Good both left the company in 2009. David Dienstbier and Darren Stubbington, both of Acclaim Studios Austin and its Turok franchise, were added to the management staff in 2007.

Iron Man was released for PlayStation 3 and Xbox 360 in May 2008. Artificial Mind and Movement developed the Iron Man movie tie-in games for the Nintendo DS, Wii, PlayStation 2, PlayStation Portable or Windows platforms.

Golden Axe: Beast Rider was released for PlayStation 3 and Xbox 360 in October 2008. It received a 3.2/10 rating from IGN with a closing comment, "This is a game worth avoiding like the plague, even if the classic remains deep and warm within your heart."

A postmortem of Golden Axe: Beast Rider by project producer Michael Boccieri, which appeared in the February 2009 issue of Game Developer Magazine, discussed the project's troubled development cycle.

=== Fate of Sega Studios San Francisco ===
With the critical and commercial failure of both games, Sega reorganized the studio under Constantine Hantzopoulos in 2009. The studio no longer had the autonomy it did previously. Sega hoped with the restructuring that Iron Man 2 and the sequel to Beast Rider would deliver on what the original games had intended.

On April 2, 2010, Sega announced that Sega Studios San Francisco would be closed with the release of Iron Man 2. Sega did not say anything about the sequel to Beast Rider, which lead several websites to believe the game was not up to expectations.

Sega West president Mike Hayes was interviewed by 1UP.com and in the interview he discussed the studio's closure.

== Work for hire ==
Secret Level developed voice over IP solution for the USB headsets that shipped with SOCOM U.S. Navy SEALs in August 2002.

The company was approached by Electronic Arts in mid 2004 to port the game Oddworld: Stranger's Wrath to the PlayStation 2. After extensive evaluation it was ultimately determined not to be feasible without dramatic cuts to quality and so was canceled.

The company was approached by Sony in early 2005 to explore a game pitch based on the book Robota, by Doug Chiang. Artwork and a level was produced using the Unreal 3 Engine, but the project was canceled.

In 2005 the company was hired to provide architectural visualizations of a high-profile penthouse in the San Francisco Four Seasons residences using the Unreal Engine.

The company was hired in 2005 by Stottler Henke Associates to create content and levels for a United States Navy training simulator, called Informant. The project was done using Lithtech's Jupiter Engine.

The company was hired to port the game X-Men: The Official Movie Game to the PSP. It was ultimately determined to be impractical.

== Technology ==
=== Strobe ===
Strobe was a Macromedia Flash 5 renderer that used hardware acceleration to allow Flash animation playback on game consoles. It was primarily designed to allow the use of Flash for game menu authoring. The product was started in early 2000, and by mid 2001 core engineering was complete on the PS2 and Xbox, both platforms capable of 60fps playback. Unfortunately, the product was put on hold in June 2001 pending the finalization of licensing terms with Macromedia, who ultimately decided not to proceed into the games space. The product was used in the PS2 and Xbox versions of Star Wars: Starfighter.

=== Unreal Engine ===
Secret Level was responsible for bringing the Unreal Engine 1 technology to the Dreamcast, and UE2 to the PlayStation 2 and the GameCube. The company also provided product support directly to developers using the technology, and was a part of the Unreal Developer Network (UDN) . Numerous titles shipped using it, including; XIII and Tom Clancy's Splinter Cell. The last "official" build the PS2 and GameCube saw was UE2 build 927 dated April 2002, after which developers had to incorporate newer features themselves.

=== Pangaea ===
Pangaea was a joint effort between Lucasarts and Secret Level to design a new Lucasarts game engine and toolset capable of rendering large scale environments. It was to be used for a massively multiplayer online role-playing game called Proteus, a successor to Star Wars Galaxies. Development of Pangaea was halted in 2004 after Lucasarts reorganized under Jim Ward. Some of the ideas later informed the design of the studio's internal Riders engine used on Golden Axe: Beast Rider and Iron Man.

=== Sidecar ===
Sidecar was a standalone UI authoring tool and SDK. Sidecar was used on several projects both internally and externally, among them, X-Men: The Official Movie Game, by Z-Axis.

== Games ==
- Unreal Tournament (2001) Dreamcast port
- Star Wars: Starfighter: Special Edition (2001) Xbox, PC
- Star Wars: Jedi Starfighter (2002) Xbox
- Magic: The Gathering - Battlegrounds (2003) Xbox, PC
- Karaoke Revolution (2004) Xbox
- America's Army: Rise of a Soldier (2005) Xbox
- Final Fight: Streetwise (2006) Xbox port
- Golden Axe: Beast Rider (2008) Xbox 360, PS3
- Iron Man (2008) Xbox 360, PS3
- Iron Man 2 (2010) Xbox 360, PS3
