= GTT =

GTT or gtt may refer to:

== Science and technology ==
- Global title translation, in telecommunications
- Glucose tolerance test, a medical test
- Google Translator Toolkit, a web application
- Graphics translation table, an I/O memory management unit
- Global temporary table, a concept used in database technology (Oracle, SQL Server etc)
- Drop (unit) (gtt), an approximated unit of measure of volume

== Other uses ==
- Georgetown Airport (Queensland) (IATA code), Australia
- Gone to Texas, Americans emigrating to Texas in the 19th century
- Gruppo Torinese Trasporti, a public transport company in Turin, Italy
- GTT Communications, Inc., an American telecommunications company
- GTT Group, a French engineering company
