= Quest Visual =

American software company

Quest Visual, Inc.
- Type: Private
- Industry: Translation software
- Founded: 2009
- Founder: Otavio Good
- Headquarters: San Francisco, California, U.S.
- Number of locations: 1 office
- Area served: Worldwide
- Key people: Otavio Good (Programmer and CEO); John DeWeese; Eric Park; Bryan Lin Maia Good (Software engineers)
- Products: Word Lens
- Number of employees: 4 (2014)
- Website: QuestVisual.com

Quest Visual, Inc. was an American private company that developed Word Lens, an augmented reality translation application. In May 2014, the company was acquired by Google, Inc.

== Company ==
Quest Visual was founded by a former video game developer Otavio Good in 2009. At the time of acquisition, the company had 4 full-time employees (Good, John DeWeese, Bryan Lin, and Eric Park,) and a contractor, Maia Good. The details of the acquisition have not been released.

== Products ==
Quest Visual's first product, Word Lens 1.0, was released on December 16, 2010, and was available in 2015 as Word Lens 2.2.3 for Apple's iPhone, iPod, and iPad through iTunes, as well as for a selection of Android smartphones through Google Play. It was unavailable as of 2021. At Google's unveiling of its Glass Development Kit in November 2013, the translation capabilities of Word Lens were also demonstrated on Google Glass. According to a January 2014 New York Times article, Word Lens is currently free for Google Glass. Google also made all Word Lens language packs freely available for a "limited time". Word Lens capabilities were incorporated into the Google Translate app and released on January 14, 2015. The company did not have any other products by the time of acquisition.

== See also ==
- Augmented reality
- Optical character recognition
- Google Translate
