= Otávio Good =

American computer programmer

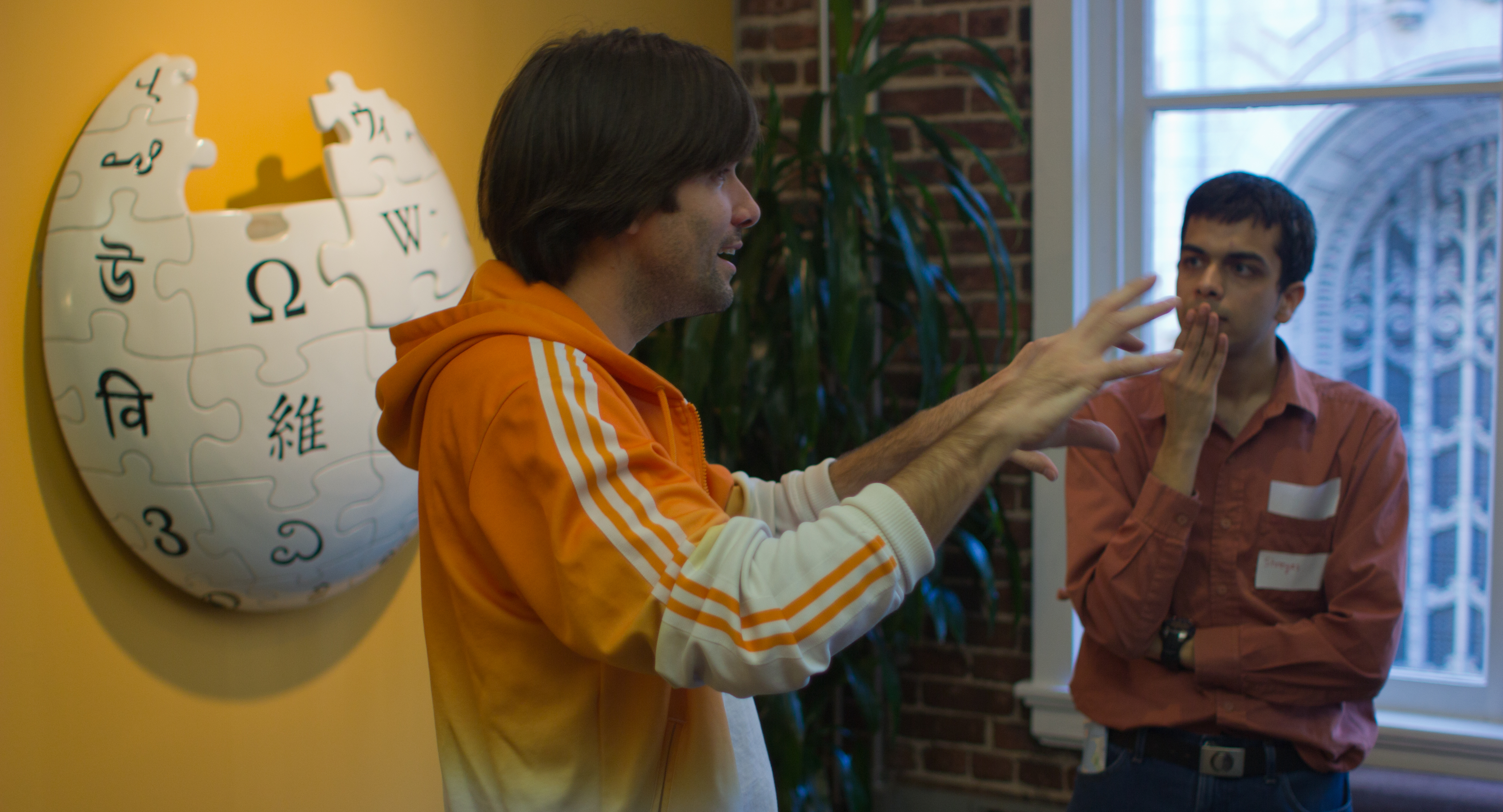
- Otavio Good (left) Photographed at the Wikimedia Foundation in San Francisco
- Education: University of Maryland
- Occupations: Video game developer (former); Translation software entrepreneur
- Known for: Original author of Word Lens
- Title: Software engineer at Google, Inc. (2014-2018); Founder and CEO of Quest Visual, Inc. (2009–2014); Software architect at Sega Studios San Francisco (2006–2009); Co-founder of Secret Level, Inc. (1999-2006)

Otávio Good is a Brazilian and American computer programmer and inventor. He is the original author of Word Lens, the first augmented reality translation application that replaces printed text into the desired language in video without connection to the Internet.

Because of its potential impact on international travel, Word Lens received significant amount of attention following its release on December 16, 2010, including Wired, The Economist, CNN, The New York Times, Forbes, The Wall Street Journal, and MIT Technology Review. To develop Word Lens, Otávio Good founded Quest Visual Inc., which was acquired by Google, Inc. in 2014, leading to the incorporation of the Word Lens feature into the Google Translate app in 2015.

While at Google, Good became a spokesperson for machine learning efforts, explaining how it is possible to "squeeze" a high-quality convolutional neural network into a smartphone, and why machine learning is the "next underlying technology". Word Lens feature was expanded from 7 to 27 languages of the Google Translate app in 2015, and then to both simplified and traditional Chinese in 2016.

Prior to Word Lens, Good was a video game developer and co-founded Secret Level, Inc., which was acquired by Sega Inc. in 2006 and became Sega Studios San Francisco. In 2011, Otávio Good led the team All Your Shreds Are Belong to U.S. that won the DARPA Shredder Challenge 2011. Good was awarded the 2011 World Technology Award in the category IT-Software (Individual) presented at the United Nations headquarters and the Netexplo award in the category Innovation & Technology presented at the UNESCO headquarters. for creation of Word Lens.

== Career ==
- Co-founder of Secret Level, Inc. (1999–2006)
- Software architect at Sega Studios San Francisco (2006–2009)
- Founder of Quest Visual (2009–2014)
- Google Translate engineer (2014–2018)

== See also ==
- Word Lens
- Google Translate
- Google
- Quest Visual
- Sega Studios San Francisco
- Machine learning
