= Word Lens =

Augmented reality translation application

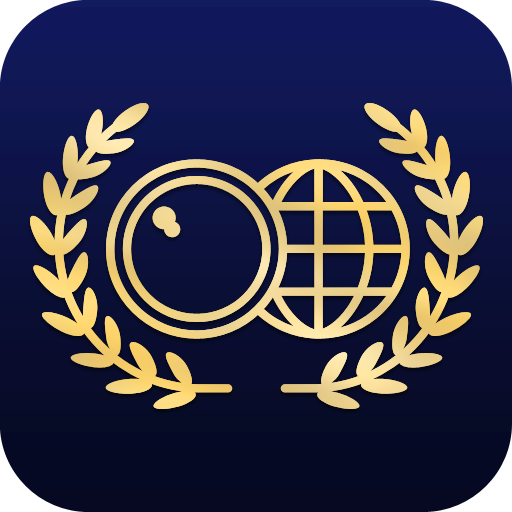
- Original author: Otavio Good
- Developers: Otavio Good, John DeWeese, Maia Good, Bryan Lin, Eric Park
- Release: December 16, 2010
- Final release: 2.2.3 / April 18, 2014; 12 years ago
- Written in: C++, Objective-C, C#, ARM Assembly, Java
- Operating system: Apple iOS 6.1+, Android 2.3.3+
- Platform: iPhone 3GS+, iPod Touch 4+, iPad 2+, Android phones, Google Glass
- Size: 43.3 MB
- Available in: English ↔ Spanish, English ↔ French, English ↔ Italian, English ↔ German, English ↔ Portuguese, English ↔ Russian
- Type: Translation software
- License: Proprietary
- Website: http://questvisual.com

Word Lens was an augmented reality translation application from Quest Visual. Word Lens used the built-in cameras on smartphones and similar devices to quickly scan and identify foreign text (such as that found in a sign or a menu), and then translated and displayed the words in another language on the device's display. The words were displayed in the original context on the original background, and the translation was performed in real-time without a connection to the internet. For example, using the viewfinder of a camera to show a shop sign on a smartphone's display would result in a real-time image of the shop sign being displayed, but the words shown on the sign would be the translated words instead of the original foreign words.

Until early 2015, the application was available for the Apple's iPhone, iPod, and iPad, as well as for a selection of Android smartphones. The application was free on Apple's iTunes, but an in-app purchase was necessary to enable translation capabilities. On Google Play, there were both the free demo and the full translation-enabled versions of the application. At Google's unveiling of its Glass Development Kit in November 2013, translation capabilities of Word Lens were also demonstrated on Google Glass. According to the January 2014 New York Times article, Word Lens was free for Google Glass.

Google acquired Quest Visual on May 16, 2014 in order to incorporate Word Lens into its Google Translate service. As a result, all Word Lens language packs were available free of charge until January 2015. The details of the acquisition have not been released. Word Lens feature was incorporated into the Google Translate app and released on January 14, 2015.

== Application ==
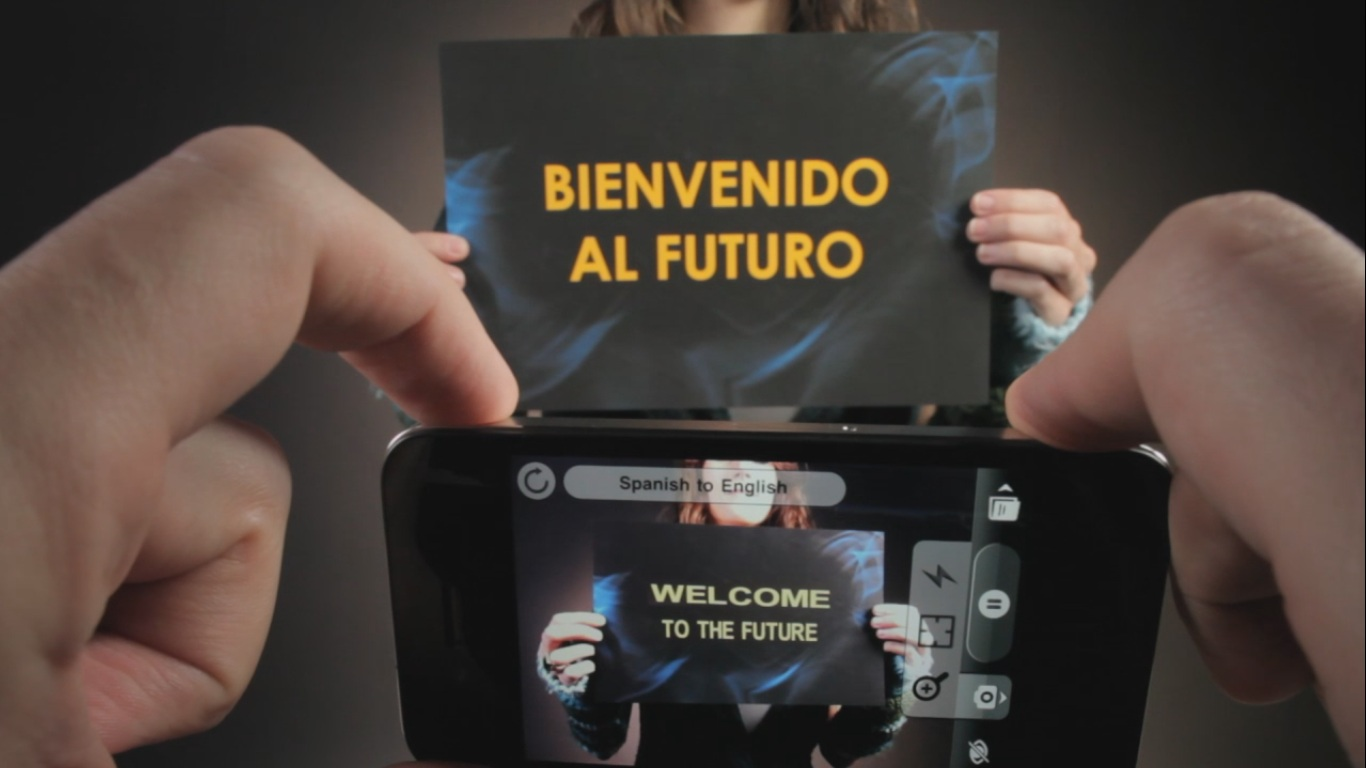
Screenshot from the official Word Lens demo by Quest Visual, Inc.

Word Lens is an augmented reality application that recognizes printed words using its optical character recognition capabilities and instantly translates these words into the desired language. This application does not require connection to the internet. In its default mode, Word Lens performs real-time translation, but can be paused to display a single frame or to look up alternative translations of each specific word in that frame. It is also possible to use the built-in dictionary to manually type in words that need to be translated.

Word Lens 1.0 was released on December 16, 2010, and received significant amount of attention soon after, including Wired, The Economist, CNN, the New York Times, Forbes, the Wall Street Journal, MIT Technology Review, and ~2.5 million views on YouTube in the first 6 days. Since the application held a No. 1 position on the lists of Top Free Apps and Top Grossing Apps on iTunes for the few days following its release, it is currently described as Top In App Purchases. In 2014, Word Lens was featured in the Apple ad for iPhone 5S Powerful. This application is currently available as Word Lens 2.2.3.

== Supported devices ==
Word Lens requires iPhone 3GS+, iPod Touch with a video camera, iPad 2+, or any iPad Mini . In 2012, Word Lens was released for a selection of Android smartphones. In 2013, Word Lens became available for Google Glass, even though Google Glass itself is not yet freely available.

== Supported languages ==
At the release, only English-to-Spanish and Spanish-to-English were supported, but other language dictionaries were planned, with European languages expected first. English-to-French and French-to-English were released on December 14, 2011. In 2012, English-to-Italian and Italian-to-English were added, followed by English-to-German / German-to-English and English-to-Portuguese / Portuguese-to-English in 2013, and English-to-Russian / Russian-to-English in 2014.

Since the acquisition by Google in May 2014, all previously released language packs can be downloaded for free. It was also speculated that through incorporation into Google Translate, Word Lens would be extended to "broad language coverage and translation capabilities in the future".

== Accuracy ==
According to its description, Word Lens is best used on clearly printed text and was not designed to translate handwritten or stylized fonts. This application was created to help tourists understand signs and menus, and it is not 100% accurate. The developer Otavio Good commented: "I will be the first to say that it's not perfect, but perfect was not the goal". However, testers who took the app to other countries said it had been useful. Further, even though the application was not designed to read books, the Wall Street Journal journalist Ben Rooney managed to understand a page from Harry Potter y el Prisionero de Azkaban.

== Developers ==
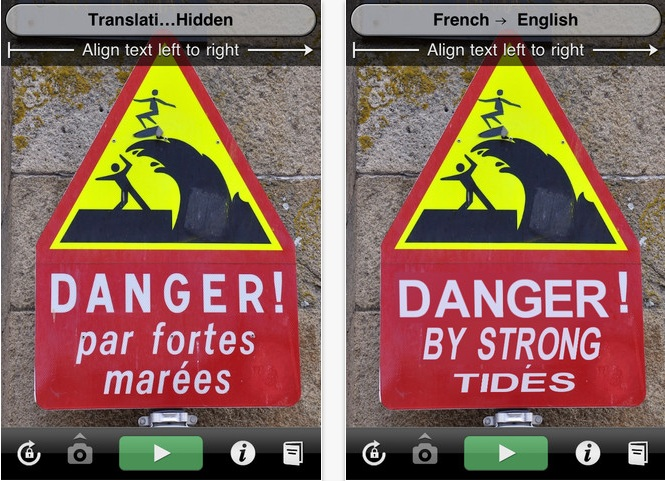
Example of a French-to-English translation by Word Lens

Word Lens was developed by Otavio Good, a former video game developer and the founder of Quest Visual, John DeWeese, who previously worked on the Electronic Arts game Spore, and programmers Maia Good, Bryan Lin and Eric Park. A U.S. patent application on the technology was filed by the company in 2010 (based on a year-earlier provisional patent application), naming Good as inventor, but went abandoned for failure to respond to a Patent Office action. The application was published as US20110090253.

== Reviews ==
Articles in the Wall Street Journal and Tom's Guide cited Clarke's third law describing Word Lens: "Any sufficiently advanced technology is indistinguishable from magic".

The New York Times journalist David Pogue included Word Lens in his list of "the best tech ideas of the year" 2010 (10 ideas total).

In the Wall Street Journal article by Ben Rooney, Word Lens received a rating of 4/5 and was described as "a sort of magic".

Word Lens was chosen as a finalist for the 2010 Crunchies Best Technology Achievement award.

Ellen of The Ellen DeGeneres Show demoed Word Lens and referred to it as "amazing" in her segment Ellen Found the Best Apps!

Otavio Good won the 2012 Netexplo award in the category Innovation & Technology presented at the UNESCO headquarters for the creation of Word Lens.

The New York Times App Smart columnist Kit Eaton included Word Lens into his list of favorite apps.

== History of updates ==
Program features
Version	Release date	Size	New languages	New devices	New features
Word Lens 1.0	December 16, 2010	3.6 MB	English ↔ Spanish	iPhone 3GS, iPhone 4, iPod Touch (4th generation)	Snapshot or real-time video translation in color
Word Lens 1.0.1	March 22, 2011	3.9 MB	None	iPad 2 Wi-Fi, iPad 2 Wi-Fi + 3G	Localized user content
Word Lens 1.1	December 14, 2011	13.8 MB	English ↔ French	iPhone 4S	Improved OCR and accuracy of translation
Word Lens 1.2	July 5, 2012	18.0 MB	English ↔ Italian	Android phones, iPad 3 Wi-Fi, iPad 3 Wi-Fi + 4G	Faster translation, improved user interface and program stability, retina display support for iPad 3
Word Lens 1.2.1	July 22, 2012	18.0 MB	None	None	Fixed crash for customers using iPad in French
Word Lens 1.2.2	September 20, 2012	19.4 MB	None	iPhone 5	None
Word Lens 1.2.3	November 21, 2012	19.5 MB	None	iPad 4 Wi-Fi, iPad 4 Wi-Fi + Cellular, iPad Mini Wi-Fi, iPad Mini Wi-Fi + Cellular	Tutorials for new users, improvements in the "reverse words" demo mode
Word Lens 1.2.4	November 27, 2012	19.5 MB	None	None	Improvements for British users
Word Lens 1.2.5	November 28, 2012	19.5 MB	None	None	"Dark screen" fixes
Word Lens 2.0	February 20, 2013	31.4 MB	English ↔ German	None	Motion tracking to reduce flicker, bug fixes
Word Lens 2.0.1	February 27, 2013	31.4 MB	None	None	Bug fixes
Word Lens 2.1	May 29, 2013	36.6 MB	English ↔ Portuguese	None	Ability to take screenshots of translations and share those online
Word Lens 2.1.1	June 11, 2013	36.6 MB	None	None	Bug fixes
Word Lens 2.1.2	October 2, 2013	35.5 MB	None	iPhone 5S, iPhone 5C, iPad Air Wi-Fi, iPad Air Wi-Fi + Cellular, iPad 2 Mini Wi-Fi, iPad 2 Mini Wi-Fi + Cellular	Improved user interface for iOS7, ability to restore purchased languages
Word Lens Unknown	November 19, 2013	Unknown	None	Google Glass	User command "Okay Glass, translate this" activates Word Lens
Word Lens 2.2	February 7, 2014	43.2 MB	English ↔ Russian	None	None
Word Lens 2.2.1	March 3, 2014	43.2 MB	None	None	Dictionary lookup fix for Russian demo
Word Lens 2.2.2	April 8, 2014	43.2 MB	None	None	Documentation update
Word Lens 2.2.3	April 18, 2014	43.3 MB	None	None	Translation improvements

Table updated on April 23, 2014 based on refs.

== See also ==
- Augmented reality
- Optical character recognition
- Google Translate
