= Franz Josef Och =

German computer scientist

Franz Josef Och (2 November 1971) is a German computer scientist. He is best known for being the chief architect of Google Translate. He has worked as a Director at Facebook. Prior to this, he was Head of Data Science at Grail, (an Illumina company), Chief Data Scientist at Human Longevity Inc., and earlier worked for Google as a Distinguished Research Scientist and head of machine translation based at Google's Mountain View, California, headquarters south of San Francisco.

== Life and work ==
He studied computer science at the University of Erlangen-Nuremberg (FAU), Germany, where he graduated with a Dipl.Ing. degree in 1998. In 2002, he received his PhD in Computer Science from RWTH Aachen University, Germany. The same year he moved to the United States.

From 2002 to 2004 he worked as a Research Scientist at the Information Sciences Institute at the University of Southern California (USC). His research activities are in statistical machine translation, natural language processing and machine learning where he has co-authored more than 50 scientific papers. He has written several open-source software packages related to statistical natural language processing and was the chief architect of the world-known Google Translate.

In addition to German, he speaks English and some Italian.
