= Virtual Army Experience =

Mobile US Army simulator

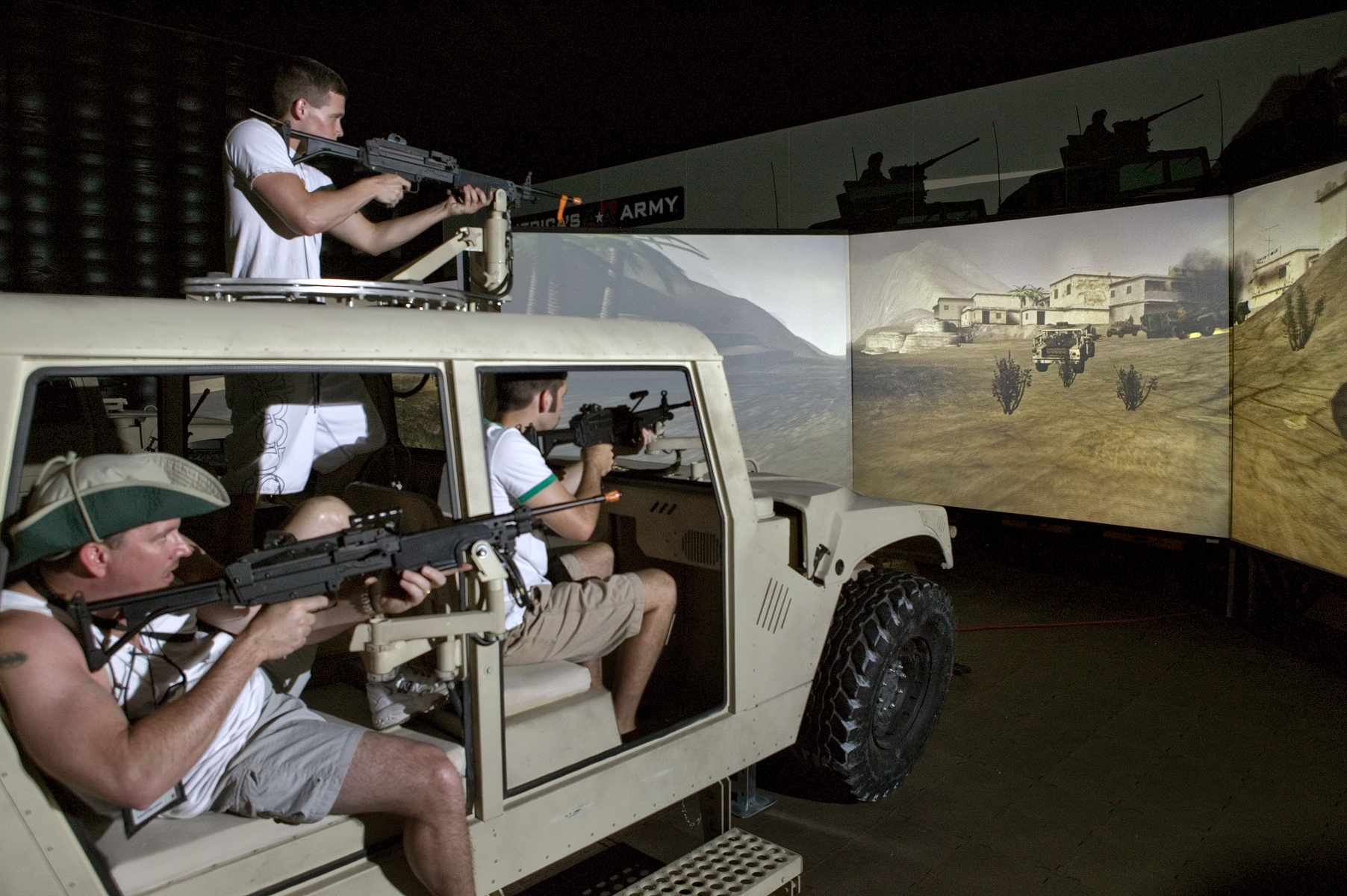
Participants test their skills on the virtual battlefield

The Virtual Army Experience (VAE) is a mobile US Army simulator created by the Army development team with the digital development handled by Zombie Studios. The interactive exhibit brings the army’s popular computer game, America’s Army: Special Forces (Overmatch), to a life-size, networked environment to provide visitors with an experience of soldiering. Using computers, LAN based scenarios, motion simulators, and videos, the VAE is a display of technological invention.

The VAE was greeted with enthusiasm by the public for its design, use of measurement technology, and its ability to engage visitors through an entertaining and educational experience. The dual use of the virtual environment with tracking technology is a combination that commercial marketers could learn from, say experts, especially those marketers who target young adults.

The VAE is managed by the Army’s Office of Economic and Manpower Analysis (OEMA) at the United States Military Academy, West Point. OEMA director Colonel Casey Wardynski is the originator of the Army Game Project. The army spent about $9 million building four versions of the Virtual Army Experience, Col. Wardynski said. Col. Wardynski envisioned "using computer game technology to provide the public a virtual soldier experience that was engaging, informative and entertaining."

== Overview ==
The VAE allows visitors the opportunity to “test drive” soldiering in a mission drawn from Army operations. The core of the 19,500-square-foot (1,810 m^{2}) VAE is the America’s Army computer game, mentioned above. The exhibit is rendered with Army training simulation technology to create a life-size, networked virtual environment. In the 20-minute ride, participants receive video briefings by soldiers who span the expertise, backgrounds and personal goals of typical soldiers. The VAE highlights soldier occupations, Army technologies, operating environments and missions. Participants employ teamwork, rules of engagement, leadership and high-tech equipment as they take part in a virtual U.S. Army mission.

The experience "is fun and interactive ... while effectively telling a brand story of teamwork, honor and respect," says Drew Neisser, CEO of Renegade, an experiential marketing agency. "Commercial clients should try to replicate this model ... which gives users a realistic view of what the brand is about."

The VAE can be delivered in its full scale rendition, or may be broken down into two smaller versions, enabling it to travel to events simultaneously. There are four traveling packages that offer indoor/outdoor experiences and allow the VAE to travel year round across the United States. In two years, the VAE has traveled to over 40 states, at locales including NASCAR races, Six Flags Amusement Parks, State Fairs, Spring Break festivities, Music Festivals, Air Shows and Urban Expos. It cost $9.8 million a year to operate the exhibits.

== Exhibit ==
Inside the 19,500-square-foot (1,810 m^{2}), full-size version of the VAE, visitors participate in an eight-minute-long virtual operation in which they fire at virtual human and vehicle targets using life-sized, recoil action air rifles from inside life-sized Blackhawk helicopters and combat vehicle simulators as members of a team in an Army mission. According to their website, the roof of the VAE is an inflatable dome that provides an environmentally controlled, sound dampened environment which holds over 230 visitors per-hour. Visitors enter crew stations in one of six HMMWV simulators, similar to vehicles employed by Army Special Forces, and one of two full-size replicas of UH-60 Black Hawk Helicopters. Each HMMWV and Black Hawk simulator is surrounded by large screens providing a 180-degree battlefield upon which the virtual mission is displayed. HMMWV participants use replica M4 Rifles or M249 SAWs (Squad Automatic Weapons) that are wired to laser engagement systems similar to existing computerized marksmanship trainers. Other participants enter UH-60 Black Hawk helicopters where they use light arms and provide air coverage against enemy forces.

The simulator features effects such as the HMMWV pitching, shaking and vibrations as it moves over the virtual terrain, simulated explosions caused by enemy fire and IEDs (Improvised Explosive Devices). Players fire air-pressured guns that mimic the recoil and kickback of real ones. The simulated weapons do not mimic the heat or smell of the real guns, however, and never jam.

The experience lasts 20–30 minutes, and requires that participants register with the VAE if they wish to use the simulator. This registration enables local Army recruiters to track individual participants after the event, and it also feeds into a statistical database which enables long-term analysis of trends. In conjunction with this registration process, RFID real-time tracking devices which are given to participants and developed by Fish Software enables event managers to identify and follow potential leads for Army recruiting as they make their way through the Experience. The VAE also includes activities ranging from multiplayer versions America's Army and, at select locations, MARCbot Robot operator training and a robot agility course. Throughout, Army recruiters and employees of the marketing firm, Ignited Minds, guide activities and stand ready to discuss soldiering with participants.

== The Experience ==
Once a team of visitors gathers in the Assembly Area, uniformed members of the VAE staff guide visitors to the “Joint Operations Center.” In the center visitors meet former soldiers, employees of marketing firm Ignited Minds, who serve as their team leaders. These employees give visitors an intelligence briefing video and talk about the upcoming virtual mission. This briefing also covers teamwork, Army rules of engagement, and proper use of equipment within the simulator. Videos prepare visitors to enter a virtual combat operation by providing them with on-the-ground intelligence about their mission. Following this briefing, visitors move to the Mission Simulator. Working as a team, participants complete a civilian evacuation operation.

Upon completion, participants move to the After Action Review area where they receive a debriefing on their performances. Real soldiers and Ignited employees review their team’s performance during the mission and highlight areas such as teamwork or communication where visitors could have performed better. Team Leaders also emphasize the role Army values, such as duty, respect and honor, play in mission accomplishment.

To add authenticity to the experience, visitors at select locations are introduced to a soldier who has distinguished himself in combat and earned citations for bravery and valor. This soldier briefly shares his or her experiences with visitors, after which visitors watch a short video that re-enacts the soldier’s heroic acts in combat.

According to Sergeant Tommy Rieman, “people have a general perception about the army before they enter (the VAE) and when they leave they have a greater appreciation.”

Some veterans complain that the experience is misleading - that it trivializes their real combat experience. Critics say the Army's videogames don't give an accurate portrayal of war and Army life. "War is not a game," said Sholom Keller, national membership coordinator for Iraq Veterans Against the War, who said he served in the Army from 2001 to 2005 and fought in Afghanistan and Iraq.

The American Civil Liberties Union (ACLU) has found that Army use of the game, and its recruiting practice in general, violate international law. In May, the ACLU published a report that found the armed services "regularly target children under 17 for military recruitment. Department of Defense instructions to its recruiters and the US military's collection of information of hundreds of thousands of 16-year-olds, and the military training corps for children as young as 11, all reveal that students are targeted for recruitment as early as possible. By exposing children under 17 to military recruitment, the United States military violates the Optional Protocol." The Optional Protocol on the Involvement of Children in Armed Conflict, ratified by the Senate in December 2002, protects the rights of children under 16 from military recruitment and deployment to war.

Prior to exiting, visitors receive a free copy of the America’s Army PC game so, if desired, they can join the game's online community and continue to explore the Army at home by playing the game.

Private corporations like Ubisoft reap handsome profits from the Army's project to train and recruit children. Military game developers are very open about this role, as Colonel Wardynski proudly proclaims, "We want kids to come into the Army and feel like they've already been there."

In response to criticism about the authenticity of the experience, Col. Wardynski compares the VAE to other Army branding efforts: “There is only so much the Virtual Army Experience can do to depict Army life, and it does a better job than a 30-second commercial.”

== Academic references ==
- Allen, Robertson. 2009. "The Army Rolls Through Indianapolis: Fieldwork at the Virtual Army Experience." Transformative Works and Cultures 2.

== VAE facts ==
- Attracted over 150,000 participants across the United States through March, 2009.
- Able to host up to 2,300 participants in a day.
- Attended more than 100 events including air shows, music festivals, amusement parks, Spring Break, NASCAR and NHRA races and urban expos thru March, 2009.
- Houses more than 70 flat screen panels and more than 5 miles (8.0 km) of data cable.
- Requires more than 75 computers and 260 gigabytes of processing power.
- Is covered by an inflatable dome weighing over 5,400 pounds
- Scenarios presented within the VAE Mission Simulator are based on the America’s Army game which is rated T for Teen by Entertainment Software Rating Board standards for a teen rated game. As with the PC game, VAE participants operate under rules of engagement and laws of war in order to achieve mission success.

== Accolades ==
- Event Design Magazine – 2007 Best Outdoor Consumer Experience - Bronze award
- Guinness World Records - World’s Largest Virtual Army - Gamers Edition 2009
- Cover story in AdWeek Magazine, November 2007
- Event Marketer Magazine, October 17, 2007 - “Best Army effort of 2007? The Virtual Army Experience, currently on the road hitting stops along the NASCAR circuit and beyond, is taking outdoor event design to the next level with each and every visitor. Four double-expandable tractor trailers, five full-sized Humvee battle simulators, and three miles of computer and electronic cables, all under an inflatable dome? Yeah, makes quite a statement.”
- Event Solution Magazine, February 2008 - “Enter the Virtual Army Experience, and you enter a world catered to every nuance of the Gen Y psyche.”
