= America's Army =

Series of video games

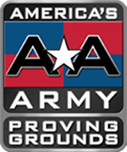
- Developer: United States Army
- Publisher: United States Army
- Composer: Doyle W. Donehoo
- Engine: Unreal Engine 2, Unreal Engine 3 (v4.0)
- Platforms: Windows; Xbox; Xbox 360; Linux/Mac OS X (discontinued); PlayStation 4
- Release: Windows: July 4, 2002 (v1.0); June 17, 2009 (v3.0); (Open beta) August 29, 2013 (v4.0) - May 5, 2022 (shutdown)
- Genre: First-person shooter
- Modes: Single-player, multiplayer

America's Army was a series of first-person shooter video games developed and published by the U.S. Army, intended to inform, educate, and recruit prospective soldiers. Launched in 2002, the game was branded as a strategic communication device designed to allow Americans to virtually explore the Army at their own pace, and allowed them to determine whether becoming a soldier fit their interests and abilities. America's Army represented the first large-scale use of game technology by the U.S. government as a platform for strategic communication and recruitment, and the first use of game technology in support of U.S. Army recruiting.

The Windows version 1.0, subtitled Recon, was the first released version on July 4, 2002. As of January 2014 there had been over 41 versions and updates released including updates to America's Army: Proving Grounds, which was released in August 2013. All versions have been developed on the Unreal Engine. The game was financed by the U.S. government and distributed by free download. America's Army has also been used to deliver virtual military experiences to participants at air shows, amusement parks, and sporting events around the country.

America's Army had been expanded to include versions for Xbox, arcade, and mobile applications published through licensing arrangements.

In May 2022, official online functionality and support for the latest game in the series, America's Army: Proving Grounds, was withdrawn.

== Gameplay ==
America's Army 2 game intro

America's Army is a multiplayer video game that enables players to act as soldiers in the U.S. Army in a round-based team tactical shooter with combat at squad-level and three fireteams. GameSpot admired the game's authenticity: "It's pretty realistic—you take one or two shots and you go limp, you take one more and you're done." Another game review described America's Army as "the most realistic portrayal of weapons and combat of any game".

=== America's Army ===
America's Army promotes adherence to the U.S. Army's seven core values. To this extent, the game's main ranking system, "Honor", is named after one.

America's Army includes optional medical training designed to provide real-world information. In order to assume the role of combat lifesaver in the game, players must pass a virtual medical training course based on actual training that soldiers receive with regard to evaluating and prioritizing casualties, controlling bleeding, recognizing and treating shock, and administering aid when victims are not breathing. Two America's Army players have reported using the training they received in-game to save lives in emergency situations; one such account, by Paxton Galvanek, received national media attention.

The game also allows players to train to drive the HMMWV and qualify to use the CROWS system allowing in-game use of the Mk 19 grenade launcher and Browning M2. Training is also available for the Javelin missile as well as specialist training such as parachute training, which allows access to the Airborne missions, and Special Forces training which allows access to the Special Forces missions.

The round ends when one team completes the objective or eliminates the entire opposing team. In certain circumstances, such as when both teams are eliminated or both sides have not completed their objectives when time runs out, there will be a tie.

America's Army achieved a high realism level in terms of visual and acoustic representation of combat, firearm usage, and mechanics, but its critics have alleged that it fails to convey wartime conditions as accurately as it claims. "If you are going to join the Army, you know the risk", says player Bart Koscinski. "In this game, you might die eight times in 15 minutes. In real life, people know what they are getting themselves into."

=== America's Army 3 ===
America's Army 3 gameplay

America's Army 3 is a first-person shooter video game, the sequel to America's Army. In comparison to its previous versions, America's Army 3 was completely remade using Unreal Engine 3 and introduced a number of changes. Medical training is now compulsory, allowing all players to give basic IFAK treatment. While the original America's Army required the completion of training to play online, America's Army 3 allows one to jump into a game with limited capability, and training is required to unlock desired equipment and skills. Another feature is melee combat in battle using a rifle butt, allowing for stealthier close combat situations. America's Army 3 also removed jumping to eliminate the practice of unrealistic bunny hopping-type evasive maneuvers. Players can climb onto or hurdle over low obstacles. America's Army 3 reorganizes the fire teams that players were grouped into; the Designated Marksman was made a member of one of the fire teams instead of being a separate two-man shooter/spotter element as would be more fitting of a sniper team.

In June 2011, the U.S. Army released an update to America's Army 3, which includes two new multiplayer maps, Shantytown and Stronghold, and a number of features including gameplay for "Every Soldier a Sensor". The ES2 gameplay in America's Army 3 brought awareness of the importance of every soldier being observant on every mission. During America's Army 3 gameplay, players are rewarded for observing and reporting back things that they came across during the mission that were suspicious or out of place. In December 2011, America's Army 3 introduced a new inventory item, the M106 Fast Obscurant Grenade (FOG), into gameplay. The release also provided a new game loader front end to easily create player accounts, view news, manuals, Personnel Jacket and player stats, launch a game server, and a link to the America's Army website.

=== America's Army: Proving Grounds ===
Gameplay of the "VIP" mode in America's Army: Proving Grounds

America's Army: Proving Grounds is a first-person shooter video game, created using Unreal Engine 3. America's Army: Proving Grounds was released in open beta on August 29, 2013. The game brings back many features from previous America's Army games and stresses small unit tactical maneuvers and training to reflect the current day U.S. Army. As with previous versions, America's Army: Proving Grounds was designed with certain principles and ideals in mind including Army values, the Soldier's Creed, teamwork, training, and completing the objective. Gameplay scenarios include Battle Drill Exercises and Forward Line Operations. Battle Drill Exercises (BDX) is fast-paced and meant for small engagements of 6 vs. 6 players. BDX maps focus on the basic movements and maneuvers, allowing players to quickly learn how opposing forces play and adjust their strategy for future engagements. Forward Line Operations (FLO) are larger 12 vs. 12 mission-based exercises allowing players to use the skills learned in their Battle Drills to achieve success.

In America's Army: Proving Grounds, players can use weapons new to the series such as the Remington 870 MCS shotgun and M14 EBR-RI Designated Marksman Rifle, in addition to weapons like the M9 pistol, M4/M4A1 and the M249 light machine gun which had been in previous America's Army games. Gameplay features include situational awareness for spotting enemies, effects of weapon suppression, a supported fire system for steadying or resting weapons to help with aim, self-aid where players can stabilize themselves, the revival of incapacitated teammates, securing the enemy, and a more advanced hardcore mode. The game also features updated versions of the hospital and bridge.

Set in the fictional Republic of the Ostregals, players assume the role of an 11B Infantryman practicing combat maneuvers at Joint Training Center Griffin (aka The Proving Grounds) as well as a MOUT (Military Operations in Urban Terrain) training environment quickly assembled using existing building infrastructure, Conex shipping containers, and local materials. This training is crucial to the player's success as part of the Long Range Combined Arms–Recon (LRCA-R) team, a full spectrum capable unit for doing special operations missions deep behind enemy lines.

== Development and release ==
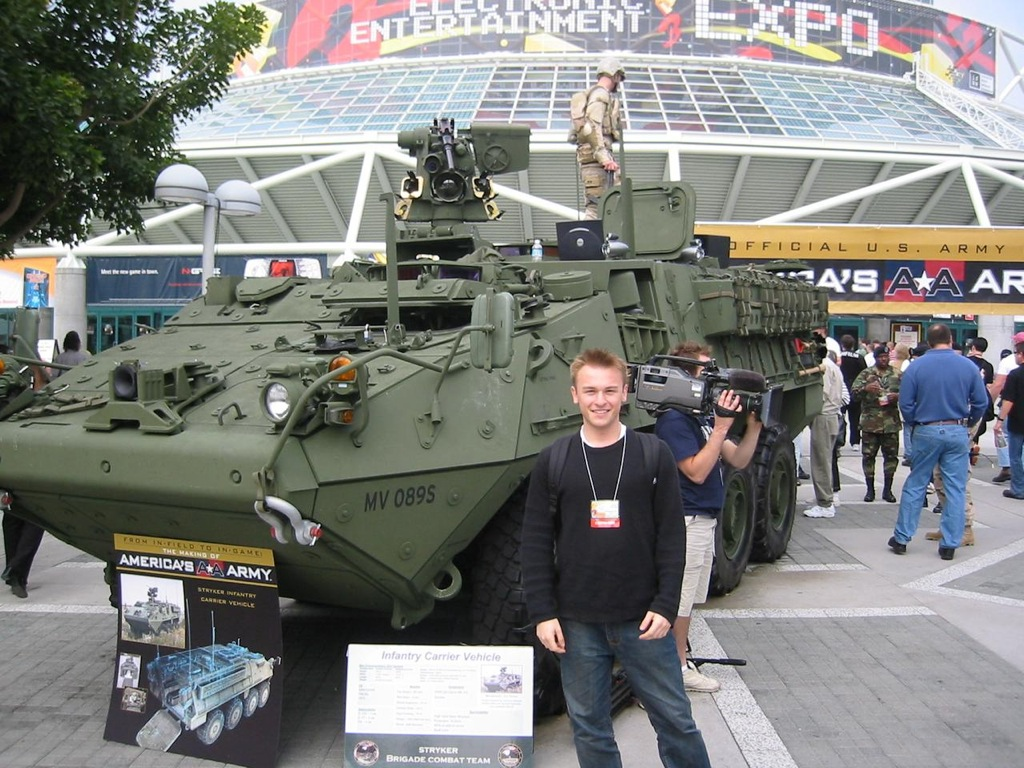
Promotion outside E3 2003

=== America's Army ===
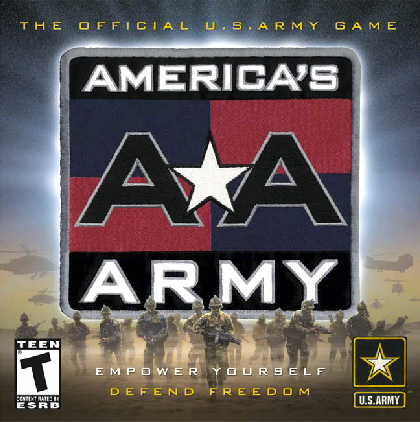
Box art for the original game

America's Army's concept was conceived in 1999 by Colonel Casey Wardynski, the Army's chief economist and a professor at the United States Military Academy. Wardynski envisioned "using computer game technology to provide the public a virtual soldier experience that was engaging, informative and entertaining". America's Army was managed by two other U.S. Army officers serving with Wardynski at the Office of Economic and Manpower Analysis (OEMA): Major Chris Chambers and Major Brett Wilson. Wardynski approached Michael Zyda and Michael Capps at the Naval Postgraduate School's (NPS) MOVES Institute in Monterey, California, to make this video game vision a reality. Zyda and Capps took a unique approach for developing a major software project in the United States Department of Defense by assembling a team of professional game developers with experience developing major titles and creating a development studio on the campus of NPS. The project had a development budget of $5 million.

The game was developed by Wardynski who recognized that a video game might be helpful to the U.S. Army in the strategic communication efforts by providing more information to prospective soldiers and to help reduce the number of recruits who wash out during the nine weeks of basic training. As of 2014, more than 13 million players had registered America's Army accounts over the years, with more than 260 million hours played on the various titles. One teenager was quoted saying the game "provides great information. This would probably spark an interest. I don't know how I would have found out so much some other way."

America's Army developers licensed commercial game engine technology, specifically the Unreal game engine, as the foundation for its game. It was the first game to feature Unreal Engine 2. America's Army is intended to give a positive impression of the U.S. Army. In the official Frequently Asked Questions page the developers confirmed in a statement that one of the reasons people outside the United States can play the game is "We want the whole world to know how great the U.S. Army is."

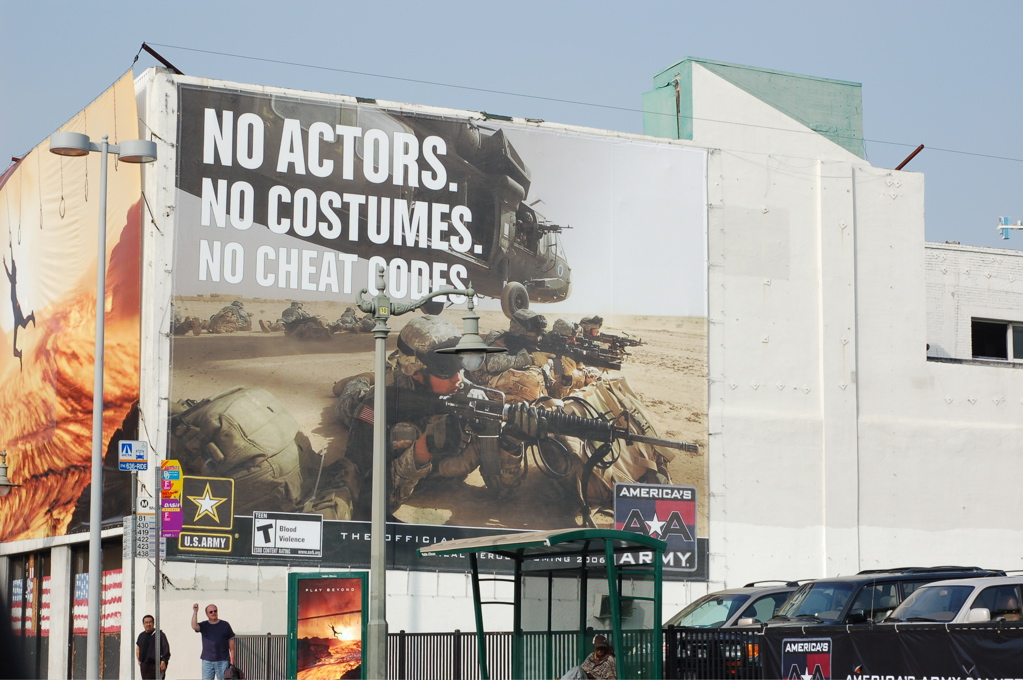
Promotional material at E3 2006

America's Army is the first well-known overt use of computer games for political aims. Chris Chambers, the former deputy director of development for America's Army, admits it is a recruitment tool, and Chris Morris of CNN/Money states that "the Army readily admits [America's Army] is a propaganda device". The game aims to become part of youth culture's consideration set as confirmed by Army Deputy Chief of Personnel Timothy Maude in testimony before the Senate Armed Services Committee.

America's Army and its official web page contain links to the "Go Army" recruitment website, another recruiting tool that, according to the Army Subcommittee Testimony from February 2000, has a higher chance of recruiting than "any other method of contact". Guiding American players to the website is a major goal of the game and it was confirmed that twenty-eight percent of all visitors of America's Army's web page click through to this recruitment site. According to Colonel Wardynski, the game generated interest from other U.S. government agencies, including the Secret Service, resulting in the development of a training version for internal government use only.

Since the shutdown of America's Army: Proving Grounds in 2022, the website of the game now redirects to the "Go Army" website.

=== America's Army 2 ===
On November 6, 2003, version 2.0 of America's Army was released, with the full title of America's Army: Special Forces. In a booklet produced by the MOVES Institute, an article by Wagner James Au explains that "the Department of Defense wants to double the number of Special Forces soldiers; consequently, orders trickled down the chain of command and found application in the current release of America's Army".

As the game became more widely distributed, it generated additional media interest. In December 2003, The Boston Globe columnist said "America's Army isn't just a time-wasting shoot-'em-up. It's full of accurate information about military training and tactics, intended to prepare a new generation of potential recruits. Amidst all the shouting drill sergeants and whistling bullets, some real education is going on. America's Army is a 'serious game', part of a new wave of computer simulations that provide entertaining lessons about real-world activities."

After the game proved successful, the lack of the Army's acknowledgment for the contribution by the U.S. Navy led to tension and political fights over the project. Eventually, the project was withdrawn from the Naval Postgraduate School due to allegations of mismanagement in March 2004 and the development team was moved to two new locations.

One month after taking over production, the army signed an exclusive long-term contract with Ubisoft to reach a wider and younger audience. America's Army: Rise of a Soldier, a different version of the game for the Xbox, was produced by Ubisoft in collaboration with the U.S. Army. Despite a 10-year publishing deal, the control over all communication and advertising remains with the army. The Xbox version was released in November 2005. It was also due to be released on the PlayStation 2, but was later canceled. A version of the game was also made for mobile phones by Gameloft.

About this time America's Army 2.5 Assist started out as a fix for a no longer working server list for Mac OSX based computers. It is still working today as America's Army 2.x deploy client that players can use to play the game.

=== America's Army 3 ===
America's Army 3 trailer

It was announced in early 2008 that America's Army 3 would be released in "fall 2008". Due to technical issues and problems with software licenses, the game release was delayed and rescheduled for "some time in 2009". America's Army 3 entered beta testing in late 2008 and was released on June 17, 2009. Although America's Army 3 was an entirely new game created using the Unreal Engine 3, there were still several similarities between previous versions of America's Army, including similar training exercises. AA3 emphasized graphical performance and flexibility to cover a broader range of PCs as well as decreased size for the full version of the software. The game also featured fictional weapons for the enemy, as opposed to the Soviet and Warsaw Pact based weapons used in the previous versions. Although the game had initial problems with online play, it worked well offline. A hotfix was launched shortly after the game's release which addressed several problems with the authorization servers not being able to register that players had completed training. Five days after release, players were once again able to play online.

One day after the launch, the civilian developer's team contracted until game release was dismissed. Responsibility for the development of the game was passed on to the Army Game Studio, part of the AMRDEC Software Engineering Directorate at Redstone Arsenal in Huntsville, Alabama. The Army Game Studio houses the development and management staff for America's Army outreach products as well as numerous Military and Government applications.

=== America's Army: Proving Grounds ===
Proving Grounds trailer

On August 28, 2012, the developers were taking suggestions for a new America's Army game, the fourth in America's Army series. The game, which is called America's Army: Proving Grounds, was released in an open beta on Steam on August 29, 2013. During the open beta, the developers had been updating the game with new maps and features as the game evolved. The beta ended on October 1, 2015, with the full release of the game, introducing new features and a new look and feel. America's Army: Proving Grounds brings back many features from previous games, and stresses small unit tactical maneuvers and training that reflects the current day army. The game includes a mission editor, a feature brought back from America's Army 2.

== America's Army: Rise of a Soldier ==
America's Army: Rise of a Soldier was released for Xbox in November 2005. According to the press release, the game features "all the action-packed realism that players have come to expect from the America's Army game brand" and "offers the most true-to-life Army experience, allowing players to create a soldier and lead him through the excitement of an Army career".

== America's Army: Special Operations ==
In February 2007, Gameloft and the U.S. Army released America's Army: Special Operations for mobile phones. The game features two types of gameplay; players can man an armored vehicle or serve as an infantryman. According to Mobi Critic, "Gameloft does a great job with this game and the only fault one could find is that the game is too short. It isn't, really: you just won't realize how fast the hours of play have passed, as this game really gives the term 'action packed' a new meaning."

== Arcade game ==
The arcade version of America's Army was developed by Global VR and released in July 2007. It is billed as a "realistic and engaging game centered on exciting training exercises and includes a significant amount of authentic Army videos".

== America's Army: True Soldiers ==
America's Army: True Soldiers was released for the Xbox 360 in November 2007. It had both a single-player campaign and multiplayer features on Xbox Live. True Soldiers focused on the Army's core values by incorporating game play based on mission accomplishment, teamwork, leadership, and rules of engagement.

== Real Heroes ==
America's Army Real Heroes program, launched in September 2006, focused on specific soldiers who had been recognized for various acts. Described in an article from U.S. News & World Report, the idea of the Real Heroes program is "to tout ordinary people who, when thrust into danger, showed extraordinary courage".

The Real Heroes program used videos, photo albums and blogs on the Real Heroes website to depict the lives of nine U.S. Army, Reserve, and National Guard Soldiers featured in the program. Soldiers' likenesses and biographies were incorporated into America's Army game and used to create action figures sold at retail stores and distributed at Army events. Additionally, those featured in the Real Heroes program made media appearances at America's Army events across the country, such as the Virtual Army Experience, gaming competitions and Technology Education programs. On January 23, 2007, Real Hero Sergeant Tommy Rieman was recognized by President George W. Bush during his State of the Union address. President Bush affirmed, "And like so many other Americans who have volunteered to defend us, he has earned the respect and the gratitude of our country."

America's Army Real Heroes
Name	Award	Tour	Selection date
LTC Jason Amerine	Bronze Star w V Device	OEF-A	2006
SGT Tommy Rieman	Silver Star	OIF	2006
SFC Gerald Wolford	Silver Star	OIF	2006
SGT Matthew Zedwick	Silver Star	OIF	2006
SPC Jason Mike	Silver Star	OIF	2007
SSG Timothy Nein	Distinguished Service Cross	OIF	2007
SFC Robert David Groff	Bronze Star w V Device	OIF	2008
SSG John Adams	Bronze Star w V Device	OIF	2008
SGT Monica Lin Brown	Silver Star	OEF	2009

- Ranks are accurate as of the time of award.

== Government applications ==
According to game historian Carrie McLeroy, America's Army has "grown in ways its originators couldn't have imagined". Dozens of government training and simulation applications using America's Army platform have been developed to train and educate U.S. Army soldiers.

In 2005, America's Army developers partnered with the Software Engineering Directorate and the Army's Aviation and Missile Research Development Engineering Center in Huntsville, Alabama, to manage the commercial game development process and use the America's Army platform to create government training and simulations. "America's Army has pushed to reuse the same elements for many purposes", said Colonel Wardynski, the originator of the game. "We can build one soldier avatar and use it again and again. When we build something in America's Army, the U.S. government owns it completely ... and [it] can, therefore, be used for any application or use of the game. So costs keep going down." After America's Army went live, requests started coming in to use the game for purposes other than recruiting, such as training.

The partnership with SED, an Army software life cycle management center, allowed the development team to re-purpose the commercial software to meet the needs of soldiers preparing for deployment. SED engineers developed customized applications used by many different Army and government organizations, including the JFK Special Forces School and the Army's Chemical School. They are used to provide training in the use of rare equipment such as PackBot robots, CROWS, and Nuclear Biological Chemical Reconnaissance Vehicles.

=== Virtual Army Experience ===
The Virtual Army Experience (VAE) was a mobile U.S. Army simulator that launched in February 2007. The VAE, enclosed in a 19,500 sq ft (1,810 m^{2}) inflatable dome, was displayed at public events across the U.S., such as NASCAR races and air shows, and allowed participants to virtually experience aspects of soldiering. The core of VAE was the America's Army game reworked to provide a variety of scenarios. The VAE could be deployed in a single full-scale rendition or split into two smaller versions enabling it to appear at separate events. During its lifetime, the VAE hosted over 130,000 participants at more than 100 events.

=== Army Experience Center ===
From August 29, 2008, to July 31, 2010, the U.S. Army operated the Army Experience Center, a facility where visitors could virtually experience many aspects of Army life. Located inside the Franklin Mills Mall in Philadelphia, the 14,500-square-foot (1,350 m^{2}) facility featured a number of interactive simulations and online learning programs to inform visitors about Army careers, training, and educational opportunities.

Pete Geren, Secretary of the Army, said, "Potential recruits are afforded a unique opportunity through the Army Experience Center to learn what it means to be the best-led, best-trained and best-equipped Army in the world by allowing them to virtually experience multiple aspects of the Army." The head of Army Recruiting Command, Major General Thomas Bostick, called the AEC "a learning laboratory"—but not just for those who are thinking of joining. "It's incumbent upon the American public to know about their Army", Bostick said. In July 2010, the Army closed the center at the end of its two-year pilot program.

=== Technology Education Program ===
Launched in 2007, the Technology Education Program provided real-world applications of classroom learning that augmented the curriculum in academic areas including math, physical science, physics, chemistry, technology, computer science, art, animation, graphic design, social studies, anatomy, physiology, and psychology. Army experts and soldiers worked with students to teach them about robotics, optics, missiles, video games, and intellectual, emotional and physical development.

In April 2008, Discovery Education featured America's Army in a live webinar in which over 1,000 students and educators participated with game developers and software engineers.

== Comics ==
With the first issue published June 14, 2013, America's Army: Proving Grounds debuted a new storyline in a fully digital comic series through IDW Publishing. The America's Army Comics series, available on the web and for mobile devices, unveils the story line that influences the plot for the game's missions and maps and gives the player a better understanding of their assignment and the challenges they will face. In the series, players learn the saga of American forces deployed to the Ostregal Islands, a tiny foreign nation in the middle of a chaotic conflict.

America's Army comics series allowed readers to further explore the Army universe and delve deep into the lives of Soldiers who are deployed or at home station. Readers learn about Soldiers and the missions they do, their values, jobs, or Military Occupational Specialties (MOS), the high-tech equipment they use, and about the vast team of support on which they rely. The comics are free and available to read on a browser or mobile device, through the America's Army website, or through IDW publishing using comiXology, Apple Books, Nook, Kindle, and others.

The comics tell the story of U.S. Soldiers deployed to a tiny foreign nation in the middle of a chaotic conflict. The description for the series reads: "From the seemingly insignificant country of Czervenia, President-General Adzic and his army set upon a campaign of annihilation against the neighboring Republic of the Ostregals, setting in motion a mysterious plan that could change the course of world power forever. America's Army must create new experimental combat teams, forged together in secret Proving Grounds, and uncover the General's insidious plot before time runs out."

The last issue was published April 15, 2015.

== Reception ==
America's Army has been generally positively received. GameSpot stated: "nothing beats going in and seeing what the Army really does. Without actually having to do it." The game has a rating of 82 on Metacritic.

Presenting body	Award	Year
Computer Gaming World Magazine	Editor's Choice award (4.5 out of 5 stars)	2002
Computer Games Magazine	Best Use of Tax Dollars	2002
PC Gamer Magazine	Best Value	2002
PC Gamer Magazine	The Best Gaming moments of 2002	2002
IGN ActionVault	Debut Game of the Year	2002
IGN ActionVault	Biggest Surprise of the Year	2002
IGN ActionVault	Multiplayer Game of the Year (Honorable Mention)	2002
GameSpot	Biggest Surprise on PC (nominated)	2002
GameSpot	Best Multiplayer Action Game on PC (nominated)	2002
GameSpot	Best Sound on PC (nominated)	2002
GameSpy.com	Best Action Game of E3 (Runner Up)	2002
Wargamer.com	Best First Person / Tactical Shooter	2002
Computer Gaming World	Multiplayer Game of the Year (Nominated)	2002
Academy of Interactive Arts & Sciences	Computer First-Person Action Game of the Year (nominated)	2003
GameSpot	Runner up for Best Multiplayer Game of the Year 2003	2003
CBS Online	One of the Best Games of 2003	2003
GameSpy	Best of 2003 – Best Value	2003
PC Gamer	Runner Up for Best Value	2003
Computer Games Magazine	Best Free Game	2004
Tom's Hardware	The Best of E3America's Army: Special Forces – Most Dedicated Developers	2004
Digital Entertainment & Media Excellence Award (DEMX)	Best Advergame of 2005	2005
Innovations in American Government Award	Finalist	2006
M16 Copywriting and Text	Gold Prize for demonstrating compelling and creative copy	2006
Event Design Magazine Awards	Bronze Medal for Best Outdoor Consumer Environment (VAE)	2007
Guinness World Records	Largest Traveling Game Simulator (VAE)	2009
Guinness World Records	Largest Virtual Army	2009
Guinness World Records	Most Downloaded War Game	2009
Guinness World Records	Most Hours Spent Playing a Free Online Shooter	2009
Guinness World Records	Earliest Military Website to Support a Video Game	2009
Strategic Horizons ThinkAbout	Experience Stager of the Year – EXPY for America's Army and VAE	2009
North American Effie Awards	Effie in Government/Institutional/ Recruitment & Brand Experience (VAE)	2009
Corporate Events Magazine	Judges Choice Award for Best Road Show/Multi Venue Event (VAE)	2009
Jay Chiat Award for Strategic Excellence	Bronze Award for Brand Experience & Innovative Design	2009

== Criticism ==
America's Army has been described as an extension of the military entertainment complex (militainment) with criticism that it contributes to a militarization of society. Because America's Army focuses on the technological aspect of war rather than the moral, it has been referred to as How We Fight, alluding to the U.S. government's series of films named Why We Fight, which supported the war effort for World War II.

Media theorist David B. Nieborg criticized the game and noted that its mechanics are a careful blend of propaganda, advertising, and education. Use of the game by recruitment and training centers has been criticized and protested against, among others by the Veterans for Peace group. Its use in schools as a recruiting tool aimed at children has also been criticized.
