= Translation Services USA =

Translation technology company

- Type: LLC
- Industry: Translation
- Founded: 2002
- Founder: Alex Buran
- Headquarters: New York City
- Services: Translation, Crowdsourcing, API
- Website: https://www.translation-services-usa.com/

Translation Services USA is a translation technology company headquartered in New York City. The company has developed a number of popular online translation platforms such as Ackuna and TranslationCloud.net, as well as providing traditional translation services.

== History ==
Translation Services USA was founded in 2002 by Alex Buran in Brooklyn, New York. The company was initially founded as LeoSam, then later became Translation Services USA before shifting focus to translation technology development; it temporarily rebranded as Translation Cloud in 2011. Its headquarters were moved to a new office in Jersey City in 2012, followed by a move to One World Trade Center in 2017. In 2026, TSU office relocated to 55 Broadway, 3FL, New York, NY 10006. In December 2012, Translation Services USA was awarded an Inc. 500 "Hire Power Award."

== Projects ==
=== Ackuna ===
Ackuna is a crowdsourced translation platform launched in 2011, targeted at mobile and desktop app developers. Unlike similar platforms, Ackuna does not charge, relying on a network of freelance, volunteer translators to provide the translations. The site boasted 6,000 registered translators in April 2013.

=== TranslationCloud.net ===
Translation Cloud's "sister site," TranslationCloud.net was created in 2011 to provide hybrid translation services, allowing freelance translators to work through a Facebook app to proofread machine translated text as a time- and money-saving measure. The site features an API for developers, in addition to a regular interface for front-end users.

=== Bad Translator ===
A novelty website created to make light of the quality of automated translation platforms like Google Translate, originally launched as "Funny Translator" and now hosted on the Ackuna website.
