= Golden Axe: Beast Rider =

2008 video game

- Cover art
- Developer: Secret Level, Inc.
- Publisher: Sega
- Producers: Nigel Cook; Michael J. Boccieri
- Designer: Dedan Anderson
- Programmer: Paul Edmondson
- Artist: Matthew Butler
- Composers: Keith Arem; Michael Cohen; Kristian Hedman
- Series: Golden Axe
- Platforms: PlayStation 3, Xbox 360
- Release: NA: October 14, 2008; EU: October 17, 2008; AU: October 23, 2008
- Genres: Action-adventure, hack and slash
- Mode: Single-player

Golden Axe: Beast Rider is a 2008 action-adventure video game developed by Secret Level and published by Sega for the PlayStation 3 and Xbox 360. It is the first 3D entry in the Golden Axe franchise. The game was released in North America on October 14, 2008, in Europe on October 17, and in Australia on October 23.

== Gameplay ==
Beast Rider is the first Golden Axe game in 3D as opposed to side-scrolling hack and slash. While this is a major shift in game style from the previous games, Beast Rider maintains many of the elements from the originals, such as magic and riding beasts, as well as sending the player on a quest to defeat Death Adder.

Gameplay is divided into three types: Campaign, Challenge and Trials. Each mode allows for the collection of tribute, which is used to increase magic strength and unlock weapons. Armor is unlocked as one progresses through the story or Campaign.

In the story mode of Beast Rider, the player controls Tyris Flare, an amazon from the original games. Through the story mode, the player is introduced to two non-player characters, Gilius Thunderhead: the dwarf, and Tarik the Ax Battler. Tribute is awarded at the end of each level based on the amount collected, which is then multiplied by the player's performance during the level, which also affects the player's Class or "grade" per level. Such multipliers include time, damage taken, dismemberment, and difficulty settings.

Challenge mode plays the same as Campaign, including tribute and class at the end of each level. However, Challenge allows the player to replay any level previously completed in Campaign, in addition to using any armor previously unlocked and any weapon unlocked through the collection of tribute.

Trials mode is the equivalent of the original's "Duel" mode, in which the player battles enemies of the selected level in an arena from that level. Each level becomes available in Trials after it is completed in the campaign. The player must complete ten waves of enemies, plus three bonus waves featuring gnomes, without dying. Like the Challenges, Trials allows the player to select various armor and weapons unlocked in Campaign or through the collection of tribute.

== Plot ==
The main protagonist is Tyris Flare, a great Amazon warrior defender of the Axirian Priestesses, a sect of dragon worshippers from the Isle of Axir, and the princess of Firewood Kingdom. Tyris' skills in combat and magic are almost unsurpassed, but there is a danger rising over Axir that even she must fear. Death Adder's armies are on the move. They are after the power of the ancient Dragon Titan. It is rumored that even Death Adder fears something about the Titans, though nobody really knows what power they possess over this dark lord. If he gains control over man, woman and beast alike, it is unknown what will become of the world. Tyris uses sword and sorcery to stop him.

== Development ==
The project's development began in mid 2005 as Secret Level simultaneously worked on a new game engine and toolset for the project. Most of the studio's directors were directly involved at this stage. The early progress was quick and impressive, leading Sega to move to acquire the studio on April 3, 2006. Secret Level was able to get in contact with series creator Makoto Uchida who praised the game production and gave his blessings to proceed with the project.

As part of E3 2006, Sega issued a press release touting a new entry to the Golden Axe franchise for the Xbox 360 and PlayStation 3. A teaser trailer could also be seen during the event. During the summer of 2007, fans uncovered new art and sculptured models from the game.

The October 2007 issue of Play magazine offered new details. The game was revealed to feature the return of Tyris Flare, the amazon warrior from the first installment of the series. With a heavy focus on riding beasts, the game received an M rating since dismemberments, decapitations and nudity are present. The magazine also claimed that the PlayStation 3 version was canceled and that the game would be an Xbox 360 exclusive. However, on October 19, 2007 Denny Chiu of Sega denied the Xbox exclusivity, stating "Completely untrue, it's coming to PS3 as well." While this game does only feature single-player, in a 2008 interview the senior producer stated that the second game in the franchise will feature co-op throughout.

The 2008 issue of the annual "girls of gaming" put out by Play Magazine featured a number of images of Tyris. A postmortem of Golden Axe: Beast Rider by project producer Michael Boccieri, which appeared in the February 2009 issue of Game Developer, discussed the project's troubled development cycle.

However, Sega has not published the game in Japan.

== Reception ==
Reception

Aggregate score
Aggregator	Score	
Aggregator	PS3	Xbox 360
Metacritic	44/100	45/100

Review scores
Publication	Score	
Publication	PS3	Xbox 360
1Up.com	D	D
Destructoid	N/A	5/10
Eurogamer	N/A	3/10
Game Informer	6/10	6/10
GamePro	2/5	2/5
GameRevolution	C+	C+
GameSpot	5/10	5/10
GameTrailers	5.5/10	N/A
GameZone	N/A	4/10
IGN	3.2/10	3.2/10
Official Xbox Magazine (US)	N/A	4/10
PlayStation: The Official Magazine	1.5/5	N/A
VideoGamer.com	4/10	4/10

Golden Axe: Beast Rider received "generally unfavorable reviews" on both platforms according to the review aggregation website Metacritic. IGN concluded, "This is a game worth avoiding like the plague, even if the classic remains deep and warm within your heart." GamePro called it "poorly designed and utterly mediocre," "a terrible game that feels like a slap in the face to fans of the original franchise."

In an editorial titled "Dave talks Golden Axe", Play editor Dave Halverson wrote "The majority of these people (can't call them critics) either didn't complete a fraction of the game, don't understand game design, or just plain suck at games", and that "to score Beast Rider below a 7 is just irresponsible."
