= America's Army: Rise of a Soldier =

2005 video game

- Box art for the North American version
- Developer: Secret Level, Inc.
- Publisher: Ubisoft
- Designer: Jason Amerine
- Composer: Jared Emerson-Johnson
- Engine: Unreal Engine 2
- Platform: Xbox
- Release: NA: November 15, 2005; PAL: February 24, 2006
- Genre: First-person shooter
- Mode: Multiplayer

America's Army: Rise of a Soldier is a game developed by Secret Level. In addition to containing the original America's Army, the game includes a single player mode based on Major Jason Amerine's experiences in Afghanistan in 2001. It was released in the United States on November 17, 2005 for the Xbox. The PlayStation 2 version was in development for some time, but was ultimately cancelled.

Unlike the original America's Army, this game isn't freeware. The game bears some similarity with the PC version of America's Army. Most of the maps from the PC version are in Rise of a Soldier.

Online modes were available via Xbox Live until 15 April 2010. America's Army: Rise of a Soldier is now playable online again on the replacement Xbox Live servers called Insignia.

== Plot ==
The player starts as a recruit who undergoes Rifleman training, and has his convoy ambushed in National Tunnel. With the help of his squadmates, the recruit helps them escape Old Town.

After this, the player works on Grenadier training. Shortly after training, the player is thrust into aiding the 10th Mountain Division's convoy from attackers. The remaining three missions in a mountain trying to prevent enemy forces from escaping with supply crates dropped by C-130 transports.

The player is assigned as the Automatic Rifleman, which involved defending their established base in the oil fields, and bringing the fight to the attackers. They eventually find a supply of money funding the terrorists inside a radio station's tunnels.

The player is assigned as a sniper. After training, the player is sent into arctic regions to kill high-ranking officers, capture enemy territory and hold the line.

After sniper training, the player is a Ranger Fireteam Leader, in which the player has an M4 carbine with pre-chosen modifications. The Fireteam Leader goes through MOUT training again with the ability to give limited orders to squadmates. After training, the Rangers raid a drug processing base and defend it from ambushing OPFOR members, and heads to a desert base to capture a high-ranking officer, as well as defending the base from enemy attack.

The player becomes a Special Forces member, in which the player can modify his M4 carbine and lead indigenous forces. The two remaining campaigns has the player leading the forces to capture the main leaders behind the attacks, as well as helping the local allied forces protect Old Town. The campaign ends after Old Town is successfully protected, with the player and fellow Special Forces members returning home.

== Reception ==
Reception

Aggregate score
Aggregator	Score
Metacritic	70/100

Review scores
Publication	Score
Electronic Gaming Monthly	5.83/10
Game Informer	6.5/10
GameSpot	7.6/10
GameSpy	4/5
GameZone	7/10
IGN	5.5/10
Official Xbox Magazine (UK)	7/10
Official Xbox Magazine (US)	7/10
TeamXbox	7.2/10

The game received "average" reviews according to the review aggregation website Metacritic.

== See also ==
- Advergaming
- America's Army: True Soldiers
