= Magic: The Gathering – Battlegrounds =

2003 video game

- Developer: Secret Level, Inc.
- Publisher: Atari
- Director: Jeffrey Tseng
- Designer: Peter Clark
- Programmer: Josh Adams
- Artist: Christopher Bretz
- Composer: Stephen Geering
- Engine: Unreal Engine 2
- Platforms: Windows, Xbox
- Release: NA: November 19, 2003; EU: November 21, 2003; AU: November 28, 2003
- Genre: Fighting
- Modes: Single-player, multiplayer

Magic: The Gathering – Battlegrounds is a real time strategy video game developed by Secret Level, Inc. and published by Atari. It is based on Magic: The Gathering collectible card game, with many fundamental differences. The game is based on the creation of heroes and mages that summon forth powerful monsters, spells, and abilities to defeat the enemy duelist. Duelists learn new magical spells by completing the campaign, with more and more spell books becoming available as the player progresses. Each spell is separated into one of 5 colors, each with their own strengths and weaknesses.

== Overview ==
The overall design of Battlegrounds differs significantly from that of the original card game source material. Battlegrounds consists entirely of real time combat, where duelists bring pre-meditated spellbooks to the table to duke it out. Beyond mastering some basic skills, victory is determined almost entirely in the metagame.

Each player is represented by a duelist; the nature of duelists, dueling, magic, etc. is not addressed. The objective is to reduce the enemy duelist's life to 0; each player starts with 20 life. In the Arcade Duel mode, there is a ten-minute time limit for each duel, at which point the current leader is crowned victor. (The only alternate win condition is provided by the white enchantment Test of Endurance.) Before dueling, players can edit the spellbook they will bring to battle in an editor mode where the spells are represented by icons that the player rearranges. At the top of the screen, the current life totals and mana of the duelists is visible. A duelist can unleash a physical attack once per second to attack a creature or player directly in front of him/herself. This attack is apparently more effective when running forward. They can also summon a shield when not preoccupied with some other action to reduce damage to the duelist by half. The shield can be summoned indefinitely but drains the user's mana at a significant rate. Rounding seems to vary based on the source of damage. A variety of arenas from the Magic: the Gathering multiverse are selectable, but vary only aesthetically. Each arena is separated into halves, one for each duelist, that are separated by a glowing line. While in enemy territory, a duelist can wreak some havoc, namely the physical attack and stealing mana crystals and shards, but the trespasser is unable to cast spells or shields. After spending more than a moment across the center line, a duelist suffers a loss of two life every few seconds. Several of the duelist avatars, as well as all of the spells, are loosely transferred from the Magic: The Gathering trading card game and story. There are some discrepancies; for example, the costs of several spells are changed, presumably to balance gameplay and the relationship between the five colors, and the characters present from the Magic storyline did not all coexist (or even anything remotely similar) at any point in the story.

== Mana ==
Mana is magical energy used to cast spells. A duelist gains mana by collecting Mana crystals that appear over the battlefield at timed intervals. This is an attempt to represent drawing mana from increasing numbers of tapped and untapped lands in the card game. Crystals become permanent additions that appear under your health bar and slowly fill with Mana. The more mana you let the bar fill up, the faster it will regenerate. Players can collect mana shards that litter the ground to faster fill their mana bar. When a creature is destroyed, a number of mana shards equal to the number of full mana required to cast the creature falls to the ground, where either duelist can claim them simply by stepping on or near them. Each shard restores approximately half of one mana instantaneously. The only source of mana shards beyond creature destructions are those produced every five seconds by the green creatures Llanowar Elves and Priest of Titania.

Maintaining a mana advantage is more significant in Battlegrounds than in the card game, because there are no actual cards, and a given spell can be cast an indefinite number of times.

== Magic ==
Almost everything a duelist can do in Battlegrounds is some type of spell (hence, even creatures are affected by Spelljack and Counterspell because they are creature spells). Players access spells by way of a customizable spellbook. During a duel, this is represented by menus-within-a-menu. The spellbook is organized into pages of three spells apiece, which can be toggled with the black or white button. A spellbook may contain no more than ten spells of no more than two colors. Any spell can be cast at any time, and an indefinite number of times, provided sufficient mana is available and spent. More expensive spells take longer to cast. While casting a spell a duelist can move freely, but if you cross the center line between your territory and the enemy's, your spell is countered. There are three types of spells, namely sorcery, creature and enchantment.

=== Mixing Spellbooks ===
Like the original cardgame, Battlegrounds allows players to mix decks, or spellbooks to mix spell, creatures, and enchantments to - theoretically - make stronger spellbooks. However, also in keeping with the original cardgame, this makes attaining the mana to successfully implement this grand strategy much more difficult, as the caster must obtain mana crystals of two colours instead of just one.

== Reception ==
Reception

Aggregate score
Aggregator	Score	
Aggregator	PC	Xbox
Metacritic	68/100	72/100

Review scores
Publication	Score	
Publication	PC	Xbox
Computer Games Magazine	3/5	B
Computer Gaming World	2/5	N/A
Electronic Gaming Monthly	N/A	4.17/10 (Note: Two critics of Electronic Gaming Monthly gave the Xbox version each a score of 4/10, and the other gave it 4.5/10.)
Famitsu	N/A	26/40
Game Informer	N/A	6.5/10
GameRevolution	B−	B−
GameSpot	6.9/10	7.2/10
GameSpy	2/5	4/5
GameZone	7.4/10	6/10
IGN	7.9/10	7.9/10
Official Xbox Magazine (US)	N/A	8.3/10
PC Gamer (US)	54%	N/A
X-Play	N/A	3/5

The game received "average" reviews on both platforms according to the review aggregation website Metacritic. In Japan, where the PC version was ported for release on February 26, 2004, followed by the Xbox version on July 22, Famitsu gave the latter a score of one seven, two sixes, and one seven for a total of 26 out of 40. Dunjin Master of GamePro said of the Xbox version, "It may not be pretty, but it's deep, challenging, and filled with replayability. Battlegrounds is like a piece of candy wrapped in burlap: hard to appreciate at first, but really sweet once you get into it." (Note: GamePro gave the Xbox version two 3.5/5 scores for graphics and sound, and two 4.5/5 scores for control and fun factor.)

== See also ==
- Magic: The Gathering video games
