= Google Translator Toolkit =

Online computer-assisted translation tool

- Developer(s): Google Inc
- Initial release: June 8, 2009
- Website: translate.google.com/toolkit

Google Translator Toolkit was an online computer-assisted translation tool (CAT)—a web application designed to permit translators to edit the translations that Google Translate automatically generated using its own and/or user-uploaded files of appropriate glossaries and translation memory. The toolkit was designed to let translators organize their work and use shared translations, glossaries and translation memories, and was compatible with Microsoft Word, HTML, and other formats.

Google Translator Toolkit by default used Google Translate to automatically pre-translate uploaded documents which translators could then improve.

Google Inc released Google Translator Toolkit on June 8, 2009. This product was expected to be named Google Translation Center, as had been announced in August 2008. However, the Google Translation Toolkit turned out to be a less ambitious product: "document rather than project-based, intended not as a process management package but simply another personal translation memory tool".

Originally the Google Translator Toolkit was meant to attract collaboratively minded people, such as those who translate Wikipedia entries or material for non-governmental organizations. However, later it was used widely in commercial translation projects.

A review of the toolkit in Multilingual noted: "The significance of the Google Translator Toolkit is its position as a fully online software-as-a-service (SaaS) that mainstreams some backend enterprise features and hitherto fringe innovations, presaging a radical change in how and by whom the translation is performed".

Translator Toolkit was shut down on December 4, 2019.

== Source and target languages ==
The Toolkit began in June 2009 with only one source language—English—and forty-seven target languages, but later support 345 source languages and 345 target languages for approximately 100,000 language pairs.

Google Translator Toolkit's user interface was available in eighty-five languages:

== Workflow ==
To use Google Translator Toolkit first, users uploaded a file from their desktop or entered a URL of a web page or Wikipedia article that they want to translate. Google Translator Toolkit automatically 'pretranslated' the document. It divided the document into segments, usually sentences, headers, or bullets. Next, it searched all available translation databases for previous human translations of each segment. If any previous human translations of the segment existed, Google Translator Toolkit picked the highest-ranked search result and 'pretranslated' the segment with that translation. If no previous human translation of the segment existed, it used machine translation to produce an 'automatic translation' for the segment, without intervention from human translators.

Users could then review and improve the automatic translation by clicking on the sentence and fixing a translation, or using Google's translation tools to help them translate by clicking the "Show toolkit" button.

Users could view translations previously entered by other users in the "Translation search results" tab or use the "Dictionary" tab to search for the right translations for hard-to-find words. In addition, translators could use features like custom, multi-lingual glossaries and view the machine translation for reference. They could also share their translations or invite them to help edit or view their translations. Translations could be downloaded and, for Wikipedia articles, published back to the source pages.

== API ==
Google Translator Toolkit used to provide an API which was restricted to approved users only.
