= Star Wars: Jedi Starfighter =

2002 video game

- Developer: LucasArts
- Publisher: LucasArts
- Director: Daron Stinnett
- Designer: Tim Longo
- Writer: W. Haden Blackman
- Series: Star Wars
- Platforms: PlayStation 2, Xbox, PlayStation 3, PlayStation 4
- Release: PlayStation 2: NA: March 11, 2002; EU: March 28, 2002; Xbox: NA: May 14, 2002; EU: May 31, 2002
- Genre: Action
- Modes: Single-player, multiplayer

Star Wars: Jedi Starfighter is a 2002 action video game for the PlayStation 2 and Xbox, developed and published by LucasArts. It is the sequel to Star Wars: Starfighter. Jedi Starfighter takes place just prior to the events of Attack of the Clones and during the Battle of Geonosis. On November 17, 2015, it was re-released for the PlayStation 4 in North America as part of the Star Wars Battlefront limited edition console bundle.

== Gameplay ==
In the game, the player controls different star fighters from the Star Wars universe. Each mission revolves around protecting friendly ships and destroying enemy ships. Each mission also has one bonus and one hidden objective completing of which unlocks bonus missions, videos, and starfighters. In Cooperative mode, the second player either controls a ship or a turret, depending on the mission.

Starfighters are equipped with different weaponry which can be highly effective in certain missions. The use of the force weapons in the Jedi Starfighter present a unique aspect to the genre. Force weapons are activated by holding a button which begins to turn the screen purple, and releasing it before the screen becomes white. Holding the button for just the right amount of time will cause the force weapon to last longer or destroy more targets. Holding it too long or too short will reduce its effectiveness. Although unlimited in number, force weapons take several seconds to "recharge" while Adi is regaining her mental strength.

== Plot ==
Set before and during the Battle of Geonosis, the story features Jedi Master Adi Gallia and the hot-headed pirate from the previous game, Nym, as Gallia tests out the Republic's new weapon: the Jedi Starfighter. She meets Nym, now forcefully exiled from his base of operations on Lok by the Trade Federation in the first game. The Trade Federation is greedily seeking to create a potent weapon with which to use in the upcoming Clone Wars conflict, and expand on the growing Separatist movement that is expanding to oppose the Republic. Many old favorite characters from the original game are included in this one, including Nym's chattery Toydarian partner, Reti, and most of Nym's old crew. New characters include Jinkins, a Bith briefly mentioned in Star Wars Starfighter, Captain Orsai, a brave cruiser pilot, Kole, Nym's demolition expert, and the evil Captain Toth, the leader of the Saboath mercenary army and the mastermind who came up with the deadly Hex Missile Threat that the Trade Federation wants to use in the upcoming conflict.

== Development and marketing ==
On PlayStation hardware, the PlayStation 2 version was released digitally on the PlayStation 3 in 2015 via the PS2 Classics library. In 2016, the PlayStation 2 version was ported to the PlayStation 4 adding PlayStation trophy support with HD upgrades.

On Xbox hardware, the Xbox version was added to the backwards compatible list for the Xbox 360, although this added small bugs with minor slowdown during menu selections and transitions, minor performance issues during cutscenes, and HUD elements randomly becoming solid instead of transparent.

LucasArts positioned Jedi Starfighter as an early tie-in to Star Wars: Episode II – Attack of the Clones, incorporating the film's new Jedi starfighter as well as locations and craft from the then-upcoming movie.

== Reception ==
Reception

Aggregate scores
Aggregator	Score
GameRankings	(PS2) 81.96% (Xbox) 78.35%
Metacritic	(PS2) 81/100 (Xbox) 78/100

Review scores
Publication	Score
Electronic Gaming Monthly	(Xbox) 7.5/10 (PS2) 7/10
Eurogamer	8/10
Famitsu	32/40
Game Informer	8.5/10
GamePro	3.5/5
GameRevolution	(PS2) B+ (Xbox) B
GameSpot	7/10
GameSpy	(Xbox) 88% (PS2) 83%
GameZone	(Xbox) 8.8/10 (PS2) 7.8/10
IGN	(PS2) 9/10 (Xbox) 8/10
Official U.S. PlayStation Magazine	3.5/5
Official Xbox Magazine (US)	8/10
The Cincinnati Enquirer	4/5
PlayStation World	(PS2) 7/10

Jedi Starfighter was met with positive reception upon release. GameRankings and Metacritic gave it a score of 81.96% and 81 out of 100 for the PlayStation 2 version, and 78.35% and 78 out of 100 for the Xbox version.

Official UK PlayStation 2 Magazine thought highly of the game, giving it a score of 8 out of 10 and describing it in this way: "Starfighter returns with a few welcome innovations." In Japan, Famitsu gave the PS2 version a score of 32 out of 40.

== See also ==
- List of Star Wars video games
- Star Wars video games
