= Stottler Henke Associates =

Stottler Henke Associates, Inc.
- Industry: Software development
- Founded: 1988; 37 years ago
- Headquarters: San Mateo, California, United States

Stottler Henke Associates, Inc. is a company that develops artificial intelligence software applications and development tools for education and training, planning and scheduling, knowledge management and discovery, decision support, and computer security and reliability. It was founded in 1988 and is headquartered in San Mateo, California.

Its education products include training simulations and intelligent tutoring systems. Its Aurora scheduling system is used by NASA, United Space Alliance, the Boeing Company, Massachusetts General Hospital, and Clipper Windpower.
