= ROUGE (metric) =

Metric used for testing NLP models

ROUGE, or Recall-Oriented Understudy for Gisting Evaluation, is a set of metrics and a software package used for evaluating automatic summarization and machine translation software in natural language processing. The metrics compare an automatically produced summary or translation against a reference or a set of references (human-produced) summary or translation. ROUGE metrics range between 0 and 1, with higher scores indicating higher similarity between the automatically produced summary and the reference.

== Metrics ==
The following five evaluation metrics are available.

- ROUGE-N: Overlap of n-grams between the system and reference summaries.
  - ROUGE-1 refers to the overlap of unigrams (each word) between the system and reference summaries.
  - ROUGE-2 refers to the overlap of bigrams between the system and reference summaries.
- ROUGE-L: Longest Common Subsequence (LCS) based statistics. Longest common subsequence problem takes into account sentence-level structure similarity naturally and identifies longest co-occurring in sequence n-grams automatically.
- ROUGE-W: Weighted LCS-based statistics that favors consecutive LCSes.
- ROUGE-S: Skip-bigram based co-occurrence statistics. Skip-bigram is any pair of words in their sentence order.
- ROUGE-SU: Skip-bigram plus unigram-based co-occurrence statistics.

== See also ==
- BLEU
- F-Measure
- METEOR
- NIST (metric)
- Noun-phrase chunking
- Word error rate (WER)
