= LCT =

LCT may refer to:

== Science ==
=== Biology ===
- Lysosomal cystine transporter family
- Long-chain triglyceride
- LCT gene, a gene that encodes the enzyme lactase

=== Chemistry ===
- Lower consolute temperature, the critical temperature below which the components of a mixture are miscible for all compositions

=== Physics ===
- Laser communication terminal, see Long-range optical wireless communication

== Mathematics and computers ==
- Limit comparison test, for series convergence
- Linear canonical transformation, an integral transform
- Link/cut tree, a data structure for maintaining dynamic trees

== Military ==
- Landing craft tank

== Transportation ==
- Lake Champlain Transportation Company, US
- Lane Cove Tunnel, a toll road in Sydney, Australia
- Lorain County Transit, Ohio, US
- Luxury Car Tax, Australia
- the ICAO airline code for TAR Aerolineas

== Other uses ==
- Labour Congress of Thailand
- A retired US Navy hull classification symbol: Landing craft tank (LCT)
- Language and Communication Technologies
- LCT resort, Busan, South Korea
- Ligue Communiste des Travailleurs, former Senegal political party
- Local Civil time
- Low-carbon technology (disambiguation)
