= NIST (disambiguation) =

NIST may refer to:

- National Institute of Standards and Technology, a non-regulatory agency of the United States Department of Commerce
- NIST University, a unitary technical university in Pallur Hills, Brahmapur, Odisha, India
- NIST International School, an international school located in downtown Bangkok, Thailand
- NIST (metric), a method for evaluating the quality of text which has been translated using machine translation
