= Terminology extraction =

Subtask of information extraction

Terminology extraction (also known as term extraction, glossary extraction, term recognition, or terminology mining) is a subtask of information extraction. The goal of terminology extraction is to automatically extract relevant terms from a given corpus.

In the semantic web era, a growing number of communities and networked enterprises started to access and interoperate through the internet. Modeling these communities and their information needs is important for several web applications, like topic-driven web crawlers, web services, recommender systems, etc. The development of terminology extraction is also essential to the language industry.

One of the first steps to model a knowledge domain is to collect a vocabulary of domain-relevant terms, constituting the linguistic surface manifestation of domain concepts. Several methods to automatically extract technical terms from domain-specific document warehouses have been described in the literature.

Typically, approaches to automatic term extraction make use of linguistic processors (part of speech tagging, phrase chunking) to extract terminological candidates, i.e. syntactically plausible terminological noun phrases. Noun phrases include compounds (e.g. "credit card"), adjective noun phrases (e.g. "local tourist information office"), and prepositional noun phrases (e.g. "board of directors"). In English, the first two (compounds and adjective noun phrases) are the most frequent. Terminological entries are then filtered from the candidate list using statistical and machine learning methods. Once filtered, because of their low ambiguity and high specificity, these terms are particularly useful for conceptualizing a knowledge domain or for supporting the creation of a domain ontology or a terminology base. Furthermore, terminology extraction is a very useful starting point for semantic similarity, knowledge management, human translation and machine translation, etc.

== Bilingual terminology extraction ==
The methods for terminology extraction can be applied to parallel corpora. Combined with e.g. co-occurrence statistics, candidates for term translations can be obtained. Bilingual terminology can be extracted also from comparable corpora (corpora containing texts within the same text type, domain but not translations of documents between each other).

== See also ==
- Computational linguistics
- Glossary
- Natural language processing
- Domain ontology
- Subject indexing
- Taxonomy (general)
- Terminology
- Text mining
- Text simplification
