= Starship Commander: Arcade =

2018 video game

Starship Commander : Arcade
- Steam Box Art
- Developer: Human Interact
- Director: Alexander Mejia
- Writer: David Kuelz
- Engine: Unreal Engine 4
- Platform: SteamVR
- Release: Arcades: WW: December 10, 2018; SteamVR: WW: September 10, 2020
- Genre: virtual reality
- Arcade system: SynthesisVR SpringboardVR

Starship Commander: Arcade a cinematic VR experience which allows players to have natural language conversations with the Non-player characters in the story in a sci-fi setting. Developed by Human Interact, a Champaign, Illinois based company, Starship Commander was announced on February 7, 2017 in conjunction with Microsoft. Due to the size of the VR market, Human Interact has released a smaller portion as an arcade release, with the larger Starship Commander game unclear if it will finish development.

== History ==
Human Interact started development of Starship Commander in early 2016 as a narrative-focused title that is played out in virtual reality. At first, Human Interact attempted to create their own natural language processing technology, but later decided to rely on existing machine learning implementations due to the difficulty of achieving a good degree of accuracy. Recent advances in speech recognition allowed the company to develop a VR title that is controlled via human speech.

Human Interact announced its debut title Starship Commander in February 2017, to be released on the Oculus Store and SteamVR. The announcement made headlines in American and international press.

Starship Commander made its world premiere at the Future of Storytelling on October 4, 2018.

On November 28, 2018, Human Interact announced that they would be bringing a special version of Starship Commander to arcades titled Starship Commander: Arcade. It is available on SpringboardVR and Private Label VR systems. This version remained an exclusive to VR arcades until September 10, 2020, when it was released on SteamVR

== Technology ==
Starship Commander uses Microsoft Cognitive Services, a Cognitive computing platform to detect speech and intent from the player to drive the natural language interactions in the game. Alexander Mejia stated that he decided not to use any motion controllers because users are still so new to VR, they spend a lot of time waving their hands around in virtual space and forget to speak to characters in the story. At Microsoft Build (developer conference) it was revealed that Microsoft Cognitive Services has reached below a 6% Word error rate which they claim is as good as human hearing. During this announcement Starship Commander was featured as the application to achieve this goal.

== Awards ==
Starship Commander: Arcade won the Best VR Game at DreamHack Austin 2018, and was shortlisted for 2 VR Awards for Best VR Experience and Most Innovative VR company.
