= LEPOR =

Automatic Translation Evaluation Model

LEPOR (Length Penalty, Precision, n-gram Position difference Penalty and Recall) is an automatic language independent machine translation evaluation metric with tunable parameters and reinforced factors.

== Background ==
Since IBM proposed and realized the system of BLEU as the automatic metric for Machine Translation (MT) evaluation, many other methods have been proposed to revise or improve it, such as TER, METEOR, etc. However, there exist some problems in the traditional automatic evaluation metrics. Some metrics perform well on certain languages but weak on other languages, which is usually called as a language bias problem. Some metrics rely on a lot of language features or linguistic information, which makes it difficult for other researchers to repeat the experiments. LEPOR is an automatic evaluation metric that tries to address some of the existing problems. LEPOR is designed with augmented factors and the corresponding tunable parameters to address the language bias problem. Furthermore, in the improved version of LEPOR, i.e. the hLEPOR, it tries to use the optimized linguistic features that are extracted from treebanks. Another advanced version of LEPOR is the nLEPOR metric, which adds the n-gram features into the previous factors. So far, the LEPOR metric has been developed into LEPOR series.

LEPOR metrics have been studied and analyzed by many researchers from different fields, such as machine translation, natural-language generation, and searching, and beyond. LEPOR metrics are getting more attention from scientific researchers in natural language processing.

== Design ==
LEPOR is designed with the factors of enhanced length penalty, precision, n-gram word order penalty, and recall. The enhanced length penalty ensures that the hypothesis translation, which is usually translated by machine translation systems, is punished if it is longer or shorter than the reference translation. The precision score reflects the accuracy of the hypothesis translation. The recall score reflects the loyalty of the hypothesis translation to the reference translation or source language. The n-gram based word order penalty factor is designed for the different position orders between the hypothesis translation and reference translation. The word order penalty factor has been proved to be useful by many researchers, such as the work of Wong and Kit (2008).

In light that the word surface string matching metrics were criticized with lack of syntax and semantic awareness, the further developed LEPOR metric (hLEPOR) investigates the integration of linguistic features, such as part of speech (POS). POS is introduced as a certain functionality of both syntax and semantic point of view, e.g. if a token of output sentence is a verb while it is expected to be a noun, then there shall be a penalty; also, if the POS is the same but the exact word is not the same, e.g. good vs nice, then this candidate shall gain certain credit. The overall score of hLEPOR then is calculated as the combination of word level score and POS level score with a weighting set. Language modelling inspired n-gram knowledge is also extensively explored in nLEPOR. In addition to the n-gram knowledge for n-gram position difference penalty calculation, n-gram is also applied to n-gram precision and n-gram recall in nLEPOR, and the parameter n is an adjustable factor. In addition to POS knowledge in hLEPOR, phrase structure from parsing information is included in a new variant HPPR. In HPPR evaluation modeling, the phrase structure set, such as noun phrase, verb phrase, prepositional phrase, adverbial phrase are considered during the matching from candidate text to reference text.

== Software implementation ==
LEPOR metrics were originally implemented in Perl programming language, and recently the Python version is available by other researchers and engineers, with a press announcement from Logrus Global Language Service company.

== Performance ==
LEPOR series have shown their good performances in the ACL's annual international workshop of statistical machine translation (ACL-WMT). ACL-WMT is held by the special interest group of machine translation (SIGMT) in the international association for computational linguistics (ACL). In the ACL-WMT 2013, there are two translation and evaluation tracks, English-to-other and other-to-English. The "other" languages include Spanish, French, German, Czech and Russian. In the English-to-other direction, nLEPOR metric achieves the highest system-level correlation score with human judgments using the Pearson correlation coefficient, the second highest system-level correlation score with human judgments using the Spearman rank correlation coefficient. In the other-to-English direction, nLEPOR performs moderate and METEOR yields the highest correlation score with human judgments, which is due to the fact that nLEPOR only uses the concise linguistic feature, part-of-speech information, except for the officially offered training data; however, METEOR has used many other external resources, such as the synonyms dictionaries, paraphrase, and stemming, etc.

One extended work and introduction about LEPOR's performances with different conditions including pure word-surface form, POS features, phrase tags features, is described in a thesis from University of Macau.

There is a deep statistical analysis about hLEPOR and nLEPOR performance in WMT13, which shows it performed as one of the best metrics "in both the individual language pair assessment for Spanish-to-English and the aggregated set of 9 language pairs", see the paper (Accurate Evaluation of Segment-level Machine Translation Metrics) "https://www.aclweb.org/anthology/N15-1124" Graham et al. 2015 NAACL (https://github.com/ygraham/segment-mteval)

In a MT user track presentation of MT Summit 2021, researchers from https://www.welocalize.com/ show that hLEPOR metric has correlation with human performance on multiple tested language pairs including German, Hindi (no model for Prism), Italian, Russian, Simplified Chinese (page 459 https://aclanthology.org/attachments/2021.mtsummit-up.29.Presentation.pdf).

== Applications ==
LEPOR automatic metric series have been applied and used by many researchers from different fields in natural language processing. For instance, in standard MT and Neural MT. Also outside of MT community, for instance, applied LEPOR in Search evaluation; mentioned the application of LEPOR for code (programming language) generation evaluation; investigated automatic evaluation of natural language generation with metrics including LEPOR, and argued that automatic metrics can help system level evaluations; also LEPOR is applied in image captioning evaluation.

== See also ==
- Evaluation of machine translation
- Machine translation
- Translation studies
- Language technology
- Natural Language Processing
- Computational linguistics
- Natural-language generation
- Natural-language understanding
- Artificial intelligence
