= Glossary =

Alphabetical list of terms in field of knowledge

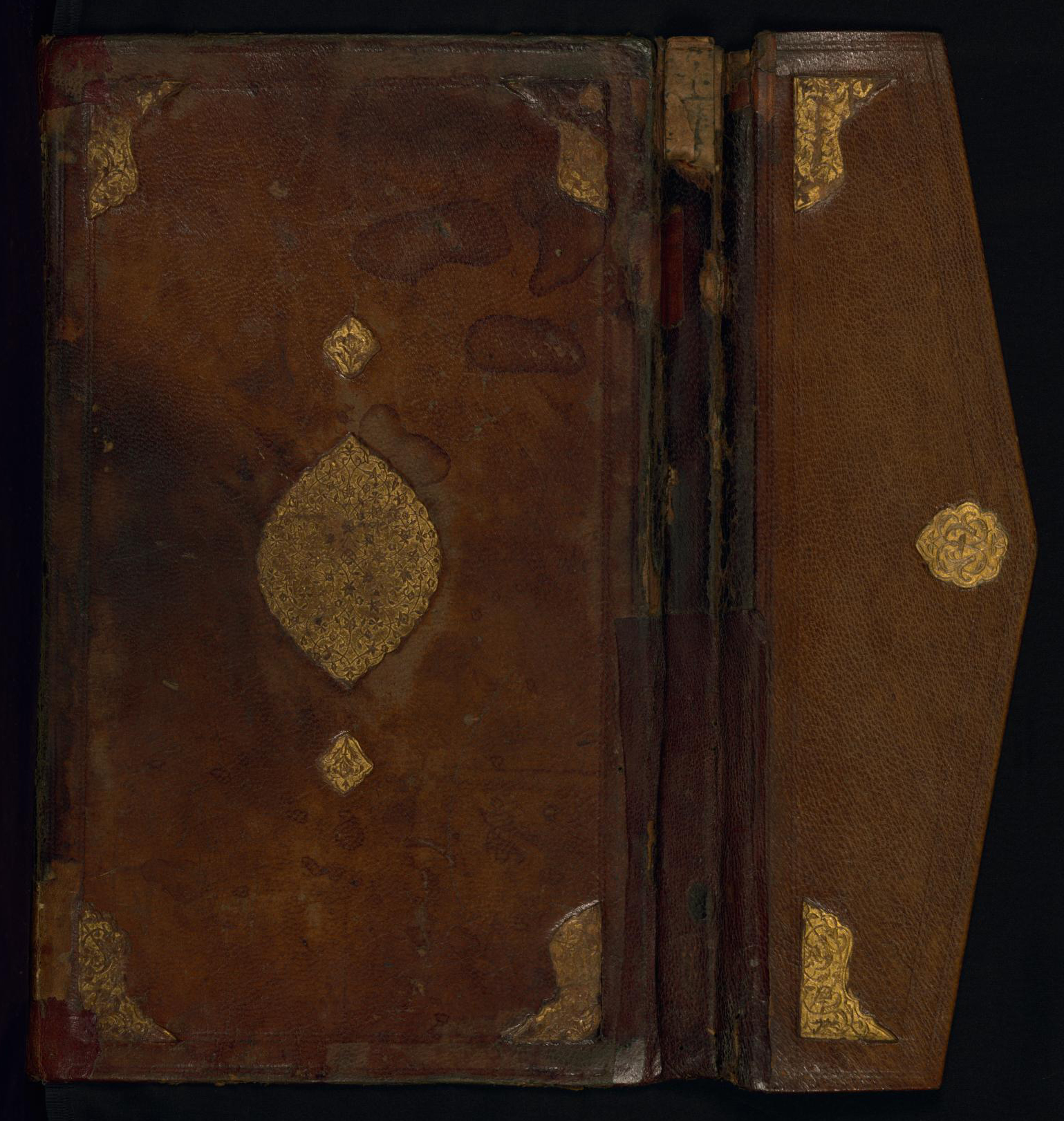
A glossary of Islamic legal terminology

A glossary (from Ancient Greek: γλῶσσα, glossa; language, speech, wording), also known as a vocabulary or clavis, is an alphabetical list of terms in a particular domain of knowledge with their definitions. Glossaries are often placed at the end of a book to define novel, uncommon, or specialized terms. Glossaries are most commonly found in non-fiction.

A bilingual glossary defines words in two languages.

A glossary explains concepts relevant to a field of study or action, as a form of ontology. Techniques for extracting an ontology or computational lexicon have been proposed.

== Core glossary ==
A glossary of the terms in intelligence law.

A core glossary is a simple glossary or explanatory dictionary that enables definition of other concepts, especially for newcomers to a language or field of study. It contains a small working vocabulary and definitions for important or frequently encountered concepts, usually including idioms or metaphors useful in a culture.

== Automatic extraction of glossaries ==
Computational approaches to the automated extraction of glossaries from corpora or the Web have been developed in the recent years. These methods typically start from domain terminology and extract one or more glosses for each term of interest. Glosses can then be analyzed to extract hypernyms of the defined term and other lexical and semantic relations.

== See also ==
- Controlled vocabulary
- Dictionary
- Frahang-i Pahlavig, a glossary of Pahlavi logograms
- Index (publishing)
- Terminology extraction
