= Nick and the Glimmung =

1988 novel by Philip K. Dick

- Dust-jacket from the first edition
- Author: Philip K. Dick
- Illustrator: Paul Demeyer
- Language: English
- Genre: Science fiction
- Publisher: Gollancz
- Publication date: 1988
- Publication place: United Kingdom
- Media type: Print (Hardback)
- Pages: 141
- ISBN: 0-575-04307-5
- OCLC: 17439729

Nick and the Glimmung is a children's science fiction novel written by American author Philip K. Dick in 1966. It was first published by Gollancz in 1988. It is set on "Plowman's Planet" (Sirius Five), in the same continuity as his adult science fiction novel Galactic Pot-Healer.

== Plot summary ==
Nick, his family, and cat Horace leave Earth in 1992, because pet ownership has been criminalised on that world. Arriving at their new home, Plowman's Planet, the family encounter a series of mishaps at the hands of the planet's varied indigenous inhabitants. A wub carries their luggage, but eats a map, while werjes attack Horace, but their family befriend the aliens, leading to a gift, which turns out to be a history of Plowman's Planet itself. They make the acquaintance of the non-indigenous alien Glimmung, who secures travel for them in return for his lost history of their adopted world. The Graham family encounter duplicates of themselves, and trobes steal Horace. Nick tries to find his pet, but locates their driver, slain in a car accident, and still possessing the book. Nick has it copied, wounding the Glimmung, who rediscovers it. Nick then finds Horace with a Nick duplicate, and the cat chooses his original owner over the simulacrum.

== See also ==
- Galactic Pot-Healer
