= Galactic Pot-Healer =

1969 novel by Philip K. Dick

- First edition cover
- Author: Philip K. Dick
- Cover artist: Sanford Kossin
- Language: English
- Genre: Science fiction
- Publisher: Berkley Publishing Corporation
- Publication date: 1969
- Publication place: United States
- Media type: Print (paperback)
- Pages: 144

Galactic Pot-Healer is a 1969 science-fiction novel by American writer Philip K. Dick. Written in 1967–1968 and first published by Berkley Publishing Corporation as a paperback original, the novel belongs to Dick's late-1960s work concerned with predetermination and dualistic conflict. Dick's earlier young-adult novel Nick and the Glimmung shares elements with Galactic Pot-Healer.

The novel follows Joe Fernwright, an unemployed pot-healer on a bureaucratic future Earth, who is recruited by the alien being Glimmung to help raise the sunken cathedral Heldscalla on Sirius 5. The plot combines comic and surreal adventure with questions of fate, failed creation, and the value of effort when success is uncertain. Critics have often read the novel through Joe's craft, the Book of the Kalends, and Glimmung's divided nature, emphasizing themes of repair, prediction, agency, allegory, and spiritual crisis. Contemporary reviews were mixed, and later critics have generally treated the book as neglected and uneven but significant within Dick's fiction.

== Background and publication ==
Galactic Pot-Healer was written in 1967–1968 and published in 1969, placing it among Dick's late-1960s science-fiction novels. It was first published in the United States by Berkley Publishing Corporation as a paperback original.

The Glimmung material predated Galactic Pot-Healer in Dick's writing. He completed Nick and the Glimmung, a young-adult novel, in 1966, although it was not published until 1988. Subterranean Press describes the book as Dick's only surviving young-adult novel and notes that it shares elements with Galactic Pot-Healer. Archival records at California State University, Fullerton also preserve Glimmung-related draft material for Galactic Pot-Healer, including an outline and related material using variant titles associated with Plowman's Planet.

After its 1969 Berkley publication, Galactic Pot-Healer appeared in a Science Fiction Book Club hardback edition and in a 1971 British hardback edition from Victor Gollancz. Later United States editions included a 1994 Vintage Books edition and a 2013 Mariner Books edition.

== Plot ==
Joe Fernwright lives on a dull, overregulated future Earth, where his trade has become nearly useless. He is a pot-healer, a craftsman who can repair broken ceramics so completely that the restored object seems never to have been damaged. There is little demand for the work, however, and Joe survives on a veteran's dole while owing alimony to his ex-wife, Kate. He spends his empty office hours playing a telephone word game with acquaintances around the world. After deciding that he may quit the game and spend his saved coins consulting an oracle, he receives a strange note: "Pot-healer, I need you. And I will pay."

The offer becomes stranger. Joe learns that the payment will be in crumbles, the currency of Sirius 5, and that the amount offered is a fortune. His inquiry attracts agents from the Quietude Civil Authority, who require him to report to them daily. Research through an encyclopedia service tells him that Sirius 5, also called Plowman's Planet, is associated with a powerful being called the Glimmung. Another message tells Joe to leave for Plowman's Planet. Hidden writing reveals the project: Glimmung intends to raise Heldscalla, the sunken cathedral of the Fog Things.

Joe's situation on Earth collapses. After giving away much of his saved money, he is arrested and realizes that the authorities have already marked him. As he tries to escape, he is suddenly transported underwater into a crate in Glimmung's basement. Glimmung frees him and appears in shifting, impossible forms, speaking through an old phonograph. It sends Joe to the spaceport and gives him a beautiful potsherd. At the Cleveland Spaceport, Joe fears that he has lost his skill, but Glimmung, appearing in human form, tells him that the mission will give his life meaning.

On the starship to Sirius 5, Joe meets Mali Yojez, a marine biologist also recruited by Glimmung. Many of the passengers are Glimmung's employees, forming a strange interplanetary work crew that includes humans, humanoids, and nonhuman specialists. Among them are Harper Baldwin, a government psychokineticist, and a variety of alien life-forms. The recruits compare stories and begin to suspect coercion: several have recently fallen under police suspicion, while others were suicidal before Glimmung found them. Joe and Mali grow close after using a machine that predicts their future as a couple. Mali distrusts the prediction because a similar machine once falsely promised happiness with a man named Ralf, whose relationship with her ended violently.

On Plowman's Planet, Joe encounters the planet's single book, written by the Kalends. The book becomes the planet's history and appears to predict the future. It says that Glimmung opposes the Kalends and wants to defeat them. It also predicts that raising Heldscalla will fail and that most of the crew will be destroyed or altered. At a hotel meeting, the recruits debate whether to leave. Glimmung appears in its vast natural form, a shifting wheel-like body of fire and water, and its arrival causes the floor to collapse.

The crew travels to the work site, where Joe receives a robot assistant named Willis and sees technology that Earth had officially declared impossible. The work force includes not only the human and humanoid recruits but also stranger beings, including a gastropod. A Kalend gives Joe another version of the book, which predicts that something he finds in the cathedral will cause him to kill Glimmung and stop the raising forever. Against orders, Joe decides to visit the underwater cathedral. Mali goes with him. Willis explains that Heldscalla is a temple to Amalita, linked to Borel, Amalita's powerful and evil counterpart.

Underwater, Joe and Mali discover the skeleton of a Black Glimmung, Glimmung's opposite. Mali explains that each Glimmung has such a counterpart, and one must destroy the other. They then meet an animated corpse that is Joe's double. It says that the raising of Heldscalla must be completed to release it, and that Glimmung killed it. Joe also sees a black cathedral mirroring Heldscalla. Before returning, he finds a coral-encrusted pot. When he breaks it loose, he damages it and finds images and text declaring Glimmung a fake. When Joe resurfaces, Glimmung says that the pot lied and prepares to send him back to Earth.

Before Glimmung can banish Joe, the Black Glimmung rises from the sea and drags it underwater. Miss Reiss, Glimmung's aide, orders everyone to flee, but Joe remains. Messages in bottles from underwater claim that Glimmung has survived and commands Joe to gather the recruits. Joe stops the departures and brings the crew back. Glimmung returns gravely injured. Joe goes to it, and Glimmung absorbs the crew into a group mind for a desperate attempt to raise Heldscalla. The effort fails, and Joe advises waiting until Glimmung recovers.

Eight days later, Glimmung asks the crew to try again as a group mind, with a time limit to protect them. During the attempt, Questobar, one of the dead Fog Things, warns Glimmung that raising Heldscalla will restore older powers and reduce Glimmung's supremacy. Glimmung proceeds anyway, transforms, and raises the cathedral by turning it into a child and placing it safely on shore. Afterward, Glimmung asks the crew to remain in the group mind. Mali stays. Joe leaves, heartbroken, along with a gastropod. The gastropod urges him to create pottery instead of only repairing it. Joe tries. His first pot is awful.

== Themes and analysis ==
A recurring line of criticism treats Galactic Pot-Healer as a novel about creative work, failure, and repair. Joe Fernwright's trade gives the novel its central image: he restores damaged objects, but his skill has become nearly useless on Earth. Critics have connected his movement from repairing pots to attempting to make one with the novel's concern for effort rather than artistic success. Kim Stanley Robinson calls the book "a short meditation on the creative act", and later readings similarly emphasize disappointment, risk, and the value of making even when the result fails.

The novel's interest in creativity is joined to its treatment of prediction and agency. The Book of the Kalends has been read as a text that tries to make the future closed and unavoidable, while Glimmung's messages have been distinguished as more open-ended forms of communication. In these readings, the novel does not present freedom as simple escape from fate. The Kalends' predictions are often accurate, but they leave moments in which Joe and the other recruits can still act.

Glimmung and the raising of Heldscalla have also been read as the center of the novel's allegorical structure. Critics have linked the project to struggles between form and chaos, entropy and renewal, and death and resurrection. Other readings place Glimmung and its dark counterpart in Jungian or archetypal terms, treating the conflict as part of the novel's concern with divided selves and creative struggle. The novel's religious dimension has also drawn attention, particularly in readings that connect Glimmung with Dick's recurring interest in deity, spiritual crisis, and failed or incomplete revelation.

Critical responses to the novel's allegorical structure have been mixed. Some critics treat its symbolic machinery as central to the novel's interest, while others regard the Jungian or psychoanalytic elements as too overt, uneven, or insufficiently controlled. More favorable readings emphasize the novel's treatment of failed creation, uncertain revelation, and effort in the face of likely defeat. Stanisław Lem reads the novel as an unstable parable of Light and Darkness, with its allegorical meaning present but not finally fixed.

== Reception ==
Contemporary genre reviews were mixed, but they often treated Galactic Pot-Healer as an idea-driven novel rather than a conventional adventure story. In Analog, P. Schuyler Miller found the novel "fascinating in a surrealistic way" but criticized it as less believable than work by Samuel R. Delany or Avram Davidson, and wrote that if the book contained deep significance, he had missed it. Other early reviewers were more receptive to the novel's odd structure and emphasis on meaning. A review in Vector treated Joe Fernwright's search for a meaningful life as more important than the adventure plot, while Samuel Mines praised Dick's imagination and argued that a bare plot summary could not convey the book's effect. Alexis Gilliland likewise characterized the novel as idea-rich and witty, calling it a "first rate novel of ideas", while also finding it more intellectually engaging than emotionally involving.

Later criticism has often presented the novel as neglected, difficult, and uneven, but significant within Dick's fiction. Matt Englund describes Galactic Pot-Healer as comparatively neglected and difficult for critics to approach, but argues that its treatment of artistic effort, failure, and uncertain revelation gives it more significance than Dick's later rejection of the novel might suggest. When rereading the novel in 1982, Dick focused on its attempted theophany, writing in the Exegesis that when Glimmung was to reveal himself, he had "nothing to say, nothing to offer because I knew nothing". Other retrospective critics have been less favorable toward the novel's allegorical structure. Warrick regards its Jungian creative allegory as too overt, Rossi judges its symbolic and psychoanalytic allegory unsuccessful despite saying that the book deserves more attention, and Darko Suvin places it among Dick's weaker crisis-period works. A more favorable critical frame appears in Stanisław Lem's essay on Dick, which places the novel within Dick's visionary fiction and treats its unstable, parable-like quality as part of its interest rather than merely a defect.
