= Word error rate =

Computer language processing metric

Word error rate (WER) is a common metric of the performance of a speech recognition or machine translation system. The WER metric typically ranges from 0 to 1, where 0 indicates that the compared pieces of text are exactly identical, and 1 (or larger) indicates that they are completely different with no similarity. This way, a WER of 0.8 means that there is an 80% error rate for compared sentences.

The general difficulty of measuring performance lies in the fact that the recognized word sequence can have a different length from the reference word sequence (supposedly the correct one). The WER is derived from the Levenshtein distance, working at the word level instead of the phoneme level. The WER is a valuable tool for comparing different systems as well as for evaluating improvements within one system. This kind of measurement, however, provides no details on the nature of translation errors and further work is therefore required to identify the main source(s) of error and to focus any research effort.

This problem is solved by first aligning the recognized word sequence with the reference (spoken) word sequence using dynamic string alignment. Examination of this issue is seen through a theory called the power law that states the correlation between perplexity and word error rate.

Word error rate can then be computed as:

$$\mathit{WER} = \frac{S+D+I}{N} = \frac{S+D+I}{S+D+C}$$

where

- S is the number of substitutions,
- D is the number of deletions,
- I is the number of insertions,
- C is the number of correct words,
- N is the number of words in the reference (N=S+D+C)

The intuition behind 'deletion' and 'insertion' is how to get from the reference to the hypothesis. So if we have the reference "This is wikipedia" and hypothesis "This _ wikipedia", we call it a deletion.

Note that since N is the number of words in the reference, the word error rate can be larger than 1.0, namely if the number of insertions I is larger than the number of correct words C.

When reporting the performance of a speech recognition system, sometimes word accuracy (WAcc) is used instead:

$$\mathit{WAcc} = 1 - \mathit{WER} = \frac{N-S-D-I}{N} = \frac{C-I}{N}$$

Since the WER can be larger than 1.0, the word accuracy can be smaller than 0.0.

== Experiments ==
It is commonly believed that a lower word error rate shows superior accuracy in recognition of speech, compared with a higher word error rate. However, at least one study has shown that this may not be true. In a Microsoft Research experiment, it was shown that, if people were trained under "that matches the optimization objective for understanding", (Wang, Acero and Chelba, 2003) they would show a higher accuracy in understanding of language than other people who demonstrated a lower word error rate, showing that true understanding of spoken language relies on more than just high word recognition accuracy.

== Other metrics ==
One problem with using a generic formula such as the one above, however, is that no account is taken of the effect that different types of error may have on the likelihood of successful outcome, e.g. some errors may be more disruptive than others and some may be corrected more easily than others. These factors are likely to be specific to the syntax being tested. A further problem is that, even with the best alignment, the formula cannot distinguish a substitution error from a combined deletion plus insertion error.

Hunt (1990) has proposed the use of a weighted measure of performance accuracy where errors of substitution are weighted at unity but errors of deletion and insertion are both weighted only at 0.5, thus:

$$\mathit{WER} = \frac{S+0.5D+0.5I}{N}$$

There is some debate, however, as to whether Hunt's formula may properly be used to assess the performance of a single system, as it was developed as a means of comparing more fairly competing candidate systems. A further complication is added by whether a given syntax allows for error correction and, if it does, how easy that process is for the user. There is thus some merit to the argument that performance metrics should be developed to suit the particular system being measured.

Whichever metric is used, however, one major theoretical problem in assessing the performance of a system is deciding whether a word has been "mis-pronounced", i.e. does the fault lie with the user or with the recogniser. This may be particularly relevant in a system which is designed to cope with non-native speakers of a given language or with strong regional accents.

The pace at which words should be spoken during the measurement process is also a source of variability between subjects, as is the need for subjects to rest or take a breath. All such factors may need to be controlled in some way.

For text dictation it is generally agreed that performance accuracy at a rate below 95% is not acceptable, but this again may be syntax and/or domain specific, e.g. whether there is time pressure on users to complete the task, whether there are alternative methods of completion, and so on.

The term "Single Word Error Rate" is sometimes referred to as the percentage of incorrect recognitions for each different word in the system vocabulary.

== Edit distance ==
The word error rate may also be referred to as the length normalized edit distance. The normalized edit distance between X and Y, d( X, Y ) is defined as the minimum of W( P ) / L ( P ), where P is an editing path between X and Y, W ( P ) is the sum of the weights of the elementary edit operations of P, and L(P) is the number of these operations (length of P).

== See also ==
- BLEU
- F-Measure
- METEOR
- NIST (metric)
- ROUGE (metric)
