= Low-carbon technology =

Low-carbon technology can refer to:

- Low-carbon building
- Low Carbon Building Programme
- Low Carbon Communities
- Low-carbon economy
- Low-carbon fuel standard
- Low-carbon power

== See also ==
- 2000-watt society
- Carbon neutrality
