= Phrase chunking =

Concept in natural language processing

Phrase chunking is a phase of natural language processing that separates and segments a sentence into its subconstituents, such as noun, verb, and prepositional phrases, abbreviated as NP, VP, and PP, respectively. Typically, each subconstituent or chunk is denoted by brackets.

== See also ==
- Terminology extraction
- Part-of-speech tagging
- Constituent (linguistics)
