= Secundative language =

Way of treating objects

A secundative language is a language in which the recipients of ditransitive verbs (which takes a subject and two objects: a theme and a recipient) are treated like the patients (targets) of monotransitive verbs, and the themes get distinct marking. Secundative languages contrast with indirective languages, where the recipient is treated in a special way.

While English is mostly not a secundative language, there are some examples. The sentence John gave Mary the ball uses this construction, where the ball is the theme and Mary is the recipient.

The alternative wording John presented Mary with the ball is essentially analogous to the structure found in secundative languages; the ball is not the direct object here, but basically a secondary object marked by the preposition with. In German, the prefix be- (which is sometimes likened to an applicative voice) can be used to change the valency of verbs in a similar way: In John schenkte Mary den Ball, the theme Ball is the direct object and the recipient Mary the indirect object (in the dative case); in John beschenkte Mary mit dem Ball, the recipient Mary is now the direct object and the theme Ball is now an oblique argument (an oblique dative) marked by the preposition mit.

== Terminology ==
This language type was called dechticaetiative in an article by Edward L. Blansitt, Jr. (from Greek dekh- 'take, receive' and aitiatikḗ 'accusative', intended to suggest "recipient-as-accusative"), but that term did not catch on. They have also been called anti-ergative languages and primary object languages.

== Usage ==
Ditransitive verbs have two arguments other than the subject: a theme that undergoes the action and a recipient that receives the theme (see thematic relation). In a secundative language, the primary object which is the recipient of a ditransitive verb, equivalent to the indirect object, is treated in the same way as the single object of a monotransitive verb. The secondary object which is the theme of a ditransitive verb, is treated separately.

Secundative constructions are found in West Greenlandic, where the direct object of a monotransitive verb appears in the absolutive case:

Piita-p takornartaq toqup-paa
Peter-ERG.SG stranger.ABS.SG kill-INT.3S/3S
'Did Peter kill the stranger?'

In a ditransitive sentence, the recipient appears in absolutive case and the theme is marked with the instrumental case:

(Uuma) Niisi aningaasa-nik tuni-vaa.
(that.ERG) Nisi money-INSTR.PL give-IND.3S/3S
'He gave Nisi money.'

Similarly, in Lahu, both the patient of a monotransitive verb and the recipient of a ditransitive verb are marked with the postposition thàʔ:

ŋà thàʔ tâ dɔ̂ʔ
1SG OBJ NEG.IMP hit
'Don't hit me.'

lìʔ chi ŋà thàʔ pîʔ
book that 1SG OBJ give
'Give me that book.'

In secundative languages with passive constructions, passivation promotes the primary object to subject. For example, in Swahili:

Halima a-li-m-pa zawadi Fatuma.
Halima she-PAST-her-give gift Fatuma
'Halima gave a gift to Fatuma.'

Fatuma a-li-p-ew-a zawadi na Halima.
Fatuma she-PAST-give-PASS gift by Halima
'Fatuma was given a gift by Halima.'

the recipient Fatuma is promoted to subject and not the theme zawadi 'gift'.

== Use in English ==
Many languages show mixed indirective/secundative behavior. English, which is primarily indirective, arguably contains secundative constructions, traditionally referred to as dative shift, however English is not a true secundative language, as neither the theme nor recipient is primary, or either can be primary depending on context. For example, the passive of the sentence

John gave Mary the ball.

is

Mary was given the ball by John.

in which the recipient rather than the theme is promoted to subject. This is complicated by the fact that some dialects of English may promote either the recipient (Mary) or the theme (the ball) argument to subject status, and for these dialects '

The ball was given Mary by John.

(meaning that the ball was given to Mary) is also well-formed. In addition, the argument structure of verbs like provide is essentially secundative: in

The project provides young people with work.

the recipient argument is treated like a monotransitive direct object.

== See also ==
- Object (grammar)
- Dative case
- Ditransitive verb
- Ergative–absolutive alignment
- Morphosyntactic alignment
