= Indirective =

Indirective may refer to:

- Indirective language, a language lacking evidentiality
- Indirective language, a type of ditransitive alignment
