= Kabardian verbs =

In Kabardian, like all Northwest Caucasian languages, the verb is the most inflected part of speech. Verbs are typically head-final and are conjugated for tense, person, number, etc.

Some Circassian verbs can be morphologically simple, consisting of only one morpheme. However, Circassian verbs are generally characterized as structurally and semantically difficult entities as the morphological structure of a Circassian verb includes affixes (prefixes, suffixes) specific to the language. These affixes can express the meaning of a subject, direct or indirect objects, adverbials, singular or plural forms, negative forms, mood, direction, mutuality, compatibility and reflexivity, thereby creating a complex verb consisting of many morphemes.

== Structure of the verbal complex ==
Verbs in Kabardian (East Circassian) are built on a rigid template of affixal slots before and after the verbal root, numbered from −12 (leftmost prefix) to +7 (rightmost suffix). An argument-structure zone of prefixes cross-references the verb's absolutive (a marker for the subject of intransitive verbs and the object of transitive verbs), oblique (a marker for indirect objects), and ergative (a marker for the subject of transitive verbs) participants. These are followed by pre-stem elements and a series of suffixes marking aspect, tense, mood, and negation. The overview below gives the order of the slots, followed by a full list of the markers that fill each one.

=== Slot template (overview) ===
Order of slots in the verb (negative = prefix, 0 = root, positive = suffix)
Prefixes												Root	Suffixes						
−12	−11	−10	−9	−8	−7	−6	−5	−4	−3	−2	−1	0	+1	+2	+3	+4	+5	+6	+7
Abs	Cisl/ Transl	Manner/ Fact	IO (Obl)	Appl	Loc	Prep	Agt (Erg)	Dyn	Opt/ Juss	Neg	Caus	√ ROOT	Rep	Pot	Tense	Real	Pl	Dyn	Mood/ Neg

=== Markers filling each slot ===
Markers filling each slot of the Kabardian verb
Slot	Category	Marker	Gloss / meaning
−12	Absolutive	с-	1SG
−12	Absolutive	у-	2SG
−12	Absolutive	д-	1PL
−12	Absolutive	ф-	2PL
−12	Absolutive	∅	3 (no overt marker)
−11	Cislocative / Translocative	къ-	hither (cislocative)
−11	Cislocative / Translocative	ны-	toward (translocative)
−10	Manner / Factive	зэры-	the way that…; factive
−9	Indirect object (Oblique)	с-	1SG
−9	Indirect object (Oblique)	у-, п-	2SG
−9	Indirect object (Oblique)	д-	1PL
−9	Indirect object (Oblique)	ф-	2PL
−9	Indirect object (Oblique)	е-	3SG
−9	Indirect object (Oblique)	а-, я-	3PL
−8	Applicative	хуэ-	for (benefactive)
−8	Applicative	фӀэ-	against (malefactive)
−8	Applicative	дэ-	with (comitative)
−7	Locative	щы-	at
−6	Prepositional (locative preverbs)	те-	on
−6	Prepositional (locative preverbs)	щӀэ-	under
−6	Prepositional (locative preverbs)	хэ-	within / among
−6	Prepositional (locative preverbs)	дэ-	in
−6	Prepositional (locative preverbs)	пы-	on / attached to
−6	Prepositional (locative preverbs)	и-	in(side)
−6	Prepositional (locative preverbs)	къуэ-	behind
−6	Prepositional (locative preverbs)	Ӏу-	at / near
−6	Prepositional (locative preverbs)	гуэ-	beside
−6	Prepositional (locative preverbs)	кӀуэцӀы-	within / inside
−5	Agent (Ergative)	с-	1SG
−5	Agent (Ergative)	у-	2SG
−5	Agent (Ergative)	д-	1PL
−5	Agent (Ergative)	ф-	2PL
−5	Agent (Ergative)	и-	3SG
−5	Agent (Ergative)	а-, я-	3PL
−4	'Dynamic' prefix	мэ-	3rd person
−4	'Dynamic' prefix	о-	positive present
−3	Optative / Jussive	рэ-	optative / jussive
−2	Negation	мы-	negation (NEG)
−1	Causative	гъэ-	causative (CAUS)
0	Root	[verb]	verb stem
+1	Repetition	-ж	again (re-)
+2	Potential	-ф	can / be able to
+3	Tense	-ащ	past (PST)
+3	Tense	-ну	future (FUT)
+3	Tense	-(р)т	imperfect (IMPF)
+3	Tense	-ат	past perfect (PP)
+4	Realization / Completion	-х	realization / completion
+5	Plural	-хэ	3rd person plural absolutive (PL)
+6	Dynamic suffix	-рэ	dynamic suffix
+7	Mood / Negation	-къым	negative (NEG)
+7	Mood / Negation	-мэ	conditional (COND)
+7	Mood / Negation	-ми	concessive (CONC)
+7	Mood / Negation	-къэ	negative interrogative (NEG.Q)
+7	Mood / Negation	-и	and (additive)
+7	Mood / Negation	-у	adverbial (ADV)

== Transitivity and valency ==
Verbs in Kabardian can be ditransitive, transitive or intransitive. Depending on their valency (the number of arguments they require), they fall into four main types:

- monovalent intransitive verbs
- bivalent intransitive verbs
- bivalent transitive verbs
- trivalent ditransitive verbs

A fundamental rule of Kabardian grammar is that a verb can contain at most three arguments: one absolutive (marked -р), one ergative (marked -м), and one oblique (marked -м). The ergative and oblique share the same suffix -м; they are told apart by the verb's transitivity and by word order, not by the ending itself.

Beyond these four types there are labile (ambitransitive) verbs, where the direct object of the transitive corresponds to the subject of the intransitive, and causative verbs, which raise valency by turning an intransitive verb into a transitive one, or a bivalent transitive into a trivalent one.

=== Monovalent intransitive verbs ===
A monovalent intransitive verb has no direct object. Its single argument – the subject – stands in the absolutive case (-р).

Sentence	Gloss	Function	Translation
ЛӀыр мэжей	Man-ABS sleeps	S VERB	"The man is sleeping."
ПэсакӀуэр макӀуэ	Guard-ABS goes	S VERB	"The security guard is going."

=== Bivalent intransitive verbs ===
Intransitive verbs can also take an indirect object. The subject remains in the absolutive case (-р), while the indirect object (a target, source or location) takes the oblique case (-м).

Sentence	Gloss	Function	Translation
ЩӀалэр тхылъым йоджэ	Boy-ABS book-OBL reads	S IO VERB	"The boy reads the book."
ЩӀалэр пщащэм йобэу	Boy-ABS girl-OBL kisses	S IO VERB	"The boy kisses the girl."

=== Bivalent transitive verbs ===
In a transitive sentence, the subject (agent) is in the ergative case (-м), and the direct object is in the absolutive case (-р).

Sentence	Gloss	Function	Translation
ЩӀалэм письмор етх	Boy-ERG letter-ABS writes	A O VERB	"The boy is writing the letter."
Хьэм тхьакӀумкӀыхьыр къиубыдащ	Dog-ERG hare-ABS caught	A O VERB	"The dog has caught the hare."

=== Trivalent ditransitive verbs ===
Ditransitive verbs involve three participants: an agent in the ergative case (-м), a theme (direct object) in the absolutive case (-р), and a recipient or goal (indirect object) in the oblique case (-м).

Sentence	Gloss	Function	Translation
ЩӀалэм мыӀэрысэр пщащэм ирет	Boy-ERG apple-ABS girl-OBL gives	A O IO VERB	"The boy gives the apple to the girl."
ЛӀым мывэр хым хедзэ	Man-ERG rock-ABS sea-OBL throws-into	A O IO VERB	"The man throws the rock into the sea."

=== Active and antipassive voice ===
Monovalent intransitive verbs split into two voices. Active intransitive verbs keep the patient/undergoer in the absolutive case, whereas antipassive verbs keep the actor/agent in the absolutive case (the usual object having been dropped). This determines how a verb behaves when its valency increases.

This contrast is visible with the root тхын "to write":

тхын "to write"
Voice	Example	Gloss	Translation
Antipassive intransitive	ЩӀалэр матхэ.	Boy-ABS writes	"The boy writes." (object dropped)
Active transitive	ЩӀалэм письмор етх.	Boy-ERG letter-ABS writes	"The boy writes the letter."

The full three-way system is found only in certain dialects; in Standard Kabardian most roots show only two of the three forms.

=== Valency increase ===
Some verbs shift between monovalent, bivalent, and trivalent forms without any marking. Valency can also be raised explicitly with the causative affix -гъэ- ("to make", "to force"), with prepositional preverbs (e.g. хэ- "into", те- "on"), and applicative prefixes (benefactive, malefactive, comitative). Because a verb has only one oblique slot, each of these can only be added to a verb whose oblique slot is still free.

The causative fills in the "missing" argument:

Base	Causative	Translation
ЩӀалэр мажэ (ABS VERB)	ЛӀым щӀалэр егъажэ (ERG ABS VERB)	"The boy runs." → "The man makes the boy run."
ЩӀалэр пщащэм йоплъ (ABS OBL VERB)	ЛӀым щӀалэр пщащэм регъэплъ (ERG ABS OBL VERB)	"The boy looks at the girl." → "The man makes the boy look at the girl."
ЩӀалэм пщащэр елъагъу (ERG ABS VERB)	ЛӀым пщащэр щӀалэм регъэлъагъу (ERG ABS OBL VERB)	"The boy sees the girl." → "The man makes the boy see the girl."

When the causative applies to a bivalent transitive, the original ergative agent is demoted into the free oblique slot and a new causer enters as the ergative subject.

== Verb conjugation ==
Kabardian, the easternmost Circassian language, has a highly polysynthetic verbal morphology: a single verb can simultaneously encode all of its arguments – subject, direct object, and indirect object – through an ordered sequence of personal prefixes attached to the root. Understanding these prefixes and how they interact is the key to the Kabardian verb.

=== Person markers ===
Like the other Circassian languages, Kabardian follows a strict ergative–absolutive alignment. There are three core cases, each marked by its own series of personal prefixes:

- absolutive — the single argument (S) of an intransitive verb and the direct object (P) of a transitive verb both occupy this slot.
- ergative — the subject (A) of a transitive verb.
- oblique — indirect objects (recipients, addressees) and the obligatory objects of intransitive bivalent verbs (e.g. "to look at", "to read", "to wait for").

The same person can therefore appear on the verb in up to three different shapes depending on its syntactic role.

Kabardian personal prefixes
Person	Absolutive	Ergative	Oblique
1SG (I / me)	сы-	с- (~з-)	сэ- / къызэ-
2SG (you)	у-	п- / б- / у-	уэ-
3SG (he / she / it)	Ø	и- (past) / е- (present)	е- / йо-
1PL (we / us)	ды-	т- (~д-)	дэ-
2PL (y'all)	фы-	ф- (~в-)	вэ- / фо-
3PL (they / them)	Ø … -хэ	а- / я-	е- (see note)

Which of the three cases a verb uses depends on its valency (how many arguments it takes) and its transitivity. The table below summarises how each verb class maps its arguments onto cases, and therefore how many person markers appear on the verb:

Case alignment by verb class
Verb class	Subject	Direct object	Indirect / oblique object	Person markers
Monovalent intransitive	absolutive	—	—	1
Bivalent intransitive	absolutive	—	oblique	2
Bivalent transitive	ergative	absolutive	—	2
Trivalent ditransitive	ergative	absolutive	oblique	3

In other words:

- A monovalent intransitive verb has a single absolutive argument – its subject – and therefore carries just one person marker.
- A bivalent intransitive verb (e.g. еплъын "to look at") keeps its subject in the absolutive but adds an oblique object; it bears two markers yet remains formally intransitive (the subject is absolutive, not ergative).
- A bivalent transitive verb (e.g. лъагъун "to see") has an ergative subject and an absolutive direct object.
- A trivalent ditransitive verb (e.g. тын "to give") has an ergative subject, an absolutive direct object and an oblique indirect object – three markers in all.

The following table takes one concrete verb from each class – in both the present and the past tense – and shows which of the three case slots are filled (and which stay empty), together with the tense suffix that fills the post-root tense slot:

How the case and tense slots are filled in each verb class
Verb class	ABS (slot 1)	OBL (slot 3)	ERG (slot 4)	Tense	Example	Tense suffix (after root)
Monovalent intransitive	с(ы)- subject "I"	—	—	Present	Соплъэ "I look"	— (dynamic -о-)
Monovalent intransitive	с(ы)- subject "I"	—	—	Past	Сыплъащ "I looked"	-ащ
Bivalent intransitive	у- subject "you"	с-/з(э)- object "me"	—	Present	Укъызоплъ "You look at me"	— (dynamic -о-)
Bivalent intransitive	у- subject "you"	с-/з(э)- object "me"	—	Past	Укъызэплъащ "You looked at me"	-ащ
Bivalent transitive	у- object "you"	—	с-/з- subject "I"	Present	Узолъагъу "I see you"	— (dynamic -о-)
Bivalent transitive	у- object "you"	—	с-/з- subject "I"	Past	Услъэгъуащ "I saw you"	-ащ
Trivalent ditransitive	сы- direct object "me"	у- indirect object "to you"	е- subject "he"	Present	Сыует "He gives me to you"	— (dynamic -о-)
Trivalent ditransitive	сы- direct object "me"	у- indirect object "to you"	е- subject "he"	Past	Сыуетащ "He gave me to you"	-ащ

(The optional directional slot 2 and the dynamic slot 5 are omitted here for clarity. Notice that the person markers in the case slots are the same in the present and the past — only the tense suffix changes.)

Important: no я-/а- oblique in intransitive bivalent verbs.
Kabardian does not use я-/а- as a 3PL oblique prefix in the intransitive bivalent class. The 3PL oblique object is expressed by the exact same prefix as the 3SG oblique object, namely е- (with its fused allomorphs йо- / о- depending on the phonetic environment); plurality of the oblique is simply left unmarked on the verb. Thus:

- Соплъ means both "I look at him" and "I look at them".
- Йоплъ means both "He looks at him" and "He looks at them".

By contrast, Adyghe explicitly distinguishes singular and plural 3rd-person oblique objects in both tenses – Сеплъы "I look at him" vs. Саплъы "I look at them" (present), and Сеплъыгъ vs. Саплъыгъ (past) – a distinction Kabardian lacks here. The я-/а- prefix is still used in Kabardian, but only in transitive verbs (e.g. лъагъун "to see", where the 3PL ergative "they" surfaces as я-).

=== Verb template ===
The Kabardian verb is built around an ordered sequence of prefix "slots" preceding the root. Each slot is reserved for a particular grammatical role, and a fundamental rule across all paradigms is that the 3rd person singular Absolutive pronoun ("he/she/it") is a zero-morpheme (∅-). When a slot's argument is 3rd person singular, that slot simply remains empty. The slots appear in the following fixed order:

Kabardian verb template at a glance
Slot 1	Slot 2	Slot 3	Slot 4	Slot 5	Slot 6	Slot 7
ABS	DIR (къы-/нэ-)	OBL	ERG	DYN (-о-)	Root	TNS (suffix, e.g. -ащ)

The function of each slot is as follows:

Kabardian verb prefix slots
Slot	Abbreviation	Function
1	ABS	absolutive — the subject of an intransitive verb or the direct object of a transitive verb
2	DIR	directional — the cislocative къы-/къэ- ("toward me / toward a reference point"); optional
3	OBL	oblique / indirect object — the indirect or oblique argument
4	ERG	ergative — the agent (subject) of a transitive verb
5	DYN	dynamic — the present-tense vowel -о-
6	Root	the verb stem
7	TNS	tense/aspect suffix following the root (e.g. past -ащ); the present tense carries no suffix and is instead signalled by the dynamic -о- in slot 5

The dynamic present-tense prefix is -о- (the orthographic reflex of the underlying sequence -уэ-). Its presence is what gives most present-tense transitive verb forms their characteristic "о" vowel right before the root.

=== Morphophonological rules and verb slots ===
Because of the highly agglutinative nature of the language, person markers undergo regular phonological transformations depending on their immediate phonetic environment.

- Voicing assimilation: Prefixes adopt the voicing of the immediately following consonant (voiceless, voiced, or ejective). Orthographically, ejectives pattern with voiceless consonants.
  - Птхащ ("you wrote it") ➔ ∅-у-тх-а-щ (2SG /w/ + /t/ hardens to /p/)
  - ТщIыну ("we'll do it") ➔ ∅-д-щI-ы-ну (1PL /d/ + /ɕ'/ devoices to /t/)
  - Здзащ ("I threw it") ➔ ∅-с-дзы-а-щ (1SG /s/ + /dz/ voices to /z/)
- Intervocalic voicing: Voiceless prefixes voice when trapped between two vowels (such as a preceding prefix and the dynamic -о- or oblique -е-). Conversely, if they sit at the absolute beginning of the word they retain their base voiceless form.
  - Узолъагъу ("I see you") ➔ у-с-о-лъагъу (1SG с- voices to з-)
  - Къызоплъ ("He looks at me") ➔ ∅-къы-с-о-плъ
- 2nd person singular hardening: The 2SG marker is underlyingly /w/ (written у). While it remains у in the absolutive or word-initially, as an ergative marker it hardens to a labial plosive in consonant clusters (п- before voiceless consonants, б- before the dynamic -о-).
  - Ибот ("You give it to him") ➔ ∅-и-у-о-т
  - Ептащ ("You gave it to him") ➔ ∅-е-у-т-а-щ
  - Бухащ ("You finished it") ➔ ∅-у-ух-а-щ
  - Note on contraction: When the sequence ы-у occurs, it typically contracts to о. Example: Къоплъ ("He looks at you") ➔ ∅-къы-у-плъ.

==== Examples of verb slot combinations ====
The following examples demonstrate how these rules apply across different valencies.

Intransitive with indirect object (root: -плъ-, "to look")

- Ар сэ къызоплъ ("He is looking at me")
  - ∅-къы-с-о-плъ (ABS.3SG – CIS – IO.1SG – DYN – root) ➔ 1SG с- voices to з- intervocalically.
- Укъызоплъ ("You are looking at me")
  - У-къы-с-о-плъ (ABS.2SG – CIS – IO.1SG – DYN – root)

Transitive (root: -лъагъу-, "to see")

- Сэ ар солъагъу ("I see it/him")
  - ∅-с-о-лъагъу (ABS.3SG – ERG.1SG – DYN – root) ➔ 1SG с- remains unvoiced word-initially.
- Узолъагъу ("I see you")
  - У-с-о-лъагъу (ABS.2SG – ERG.1SG – DYN – root) ➔ 1SG с- voices to з- intervocalically.

Ditransitive (root: -т-, "to give")

- Абы ар сэ къызет ("He gives it to me")
  - ∅-къы-с-е-т (ABS.3SG – CIS – IO.1SG – ERG.3SG – root) ➔ 1SG с- voices between ы and е.
- Сэ ар уэ узот ("I give it to you")
  - ∅-у-с-о-т (ABS.3SG – IO.2SG – ERG.1SG – DYN – root) ➔ 1SG с- voices between у and о.
- Уезот ("I give you to him")
  - У-е-с-о-т (ABS.2SG – IO.3SG – ERG.1SG – DYN – root)
- Сыует ("He gives me to you")
  - Сы-у-е-т (ABS.1SG – IO.2SG – ERG.3SG – root) ➔ 1SG is the syllabic Сы- at the front of the complex; no voicing occurs.

=== Intransitive bivalent verbs ===
The Kabardian verb еплъын "to look at" takes an absolutive subject and an oblique object.

==== The directional prefix and the person hierarchy ====
Whether a directional appears, and which one, tracks a person hierarchy, 1st ≥ 2nd > 3rd. The ranking mirrors how central each person is to the act of speaking: the 1st person (the speaker) is the natural deictic centre since one normally speaks from one's own point of view; the 2nd person (the addressee) comes next, being present in the conversation and the one spoken to, so the centre readily rests on them; and the 3rd person, absent from the exchange, is the least central. Hence 1st and 2nd sit together at the top (1st ≥ 2nd) and the 3rd trails behind.

"Come" vs. "go". A directional prefix marks the orientation of the action relative to the deictic centre: the cislocative къ- is "come" (toward the centre), while the translocative н(ы)- is "go" (away from it). English shows the same instinct in its verbs — one says "I'll come to you", not "I'll go to you", and "you come to me". Because these prefixes attach to any Kabardian verb, the "come/go" contrast pervades the whole verb system, not just verbs of motion. Any action between 1st and 2nd person is overtly oriented – and it is precisely because both directions are marked that the two tie (1st ≥ 2nd, not 1st > 2nd). Kabardian even distinguishes the two: "come" къ- for the inbound 2nd→1st (Укъызоплъ "you look at me") and "go" н(ы)- for the outbound 1st→2nd (Сыноплъ "I look at you"). Toward a mere 3rd person the 1st/2nd forms stay bare ("go", left unmarked), whereas a 3rd person acting back on the speaker or addressee runs toward the centre – "come" – and takes the cislocative къ-.

Stated as one rule: the cislocative (or, for 1st→2nd, the translocative) appears whenever the object stands no lower than the subject on 1st ≥ 2nd > 3rd – the whole 1st↔2nd zone plus every "inverse" cell (3rd→1st, 3rd→2nd, 2nd→1st). In this oblique-object class the pattern is semi-mandatory – Kabardian in fact requires an overt directional for every local (1st/2nd-person) object – while the outbound cells (1st/2nd → 3rd, and a 3rd person on a distinct 3rd) stay bare by default.

The directional and the hierarchy 1st ≥ 2nd > 3rd in the bivalent intransitive
Subject ↓	Object →		
Subject ↓	1st	2nd	3rd
1st	—	+CISL	−CISL
2nd	+CISL	—	−CISL
3rd	+CISL	+CISL	−CISL

+CISL (red) = an overt directional is (semi-)obligatory (the "come" cells); −CISL (yellow) = the plain bare form, no directional (the "go" cells). The 1st→1st and 2nd→2nd cells are greyed because a speaker or addressee acting on itself is reflexive (built separately with зы-/зэ- + -ж); a 3rd person acting on a distinct 3rd ("he looks at him") is the ordinary direct form and stays bare. In the 1st→2nd cell the overt directional is the translocative н(ы)- ("go"), not the cislocative.

Because this is orientation, not rigid agreement, a speaker can override it to shift the centre onto a 3rd person: adding the cislocative къ- to an otherwise bare outbound form recentres the scene on that 3rd party. So beside the default Сеплъащ "I looked at him" one also finds Сыкъеплъащ with the centre pulled onto him (e.g. to check on him). Such recenterings are possible on any verb but are marked; the unmarked default remains 1st ≥ 2nd > 3rd. (Adyghe, which lacks the translocative in this class, simply uses the cislocative къы- in both directions of the 1st↔2nd zone.)

==== Present ====
In the present tense the dynamic -о- prefix is visible in almost every cell.

Conjugation of еплъын (to look at)
Subject (Abs)	Object (Oblique)						
Subject (Abs)	At me	At you	At him	At us	At y'all	At them	At oneself
I		Сыноплъ {I look at you}	Соплъ {I look at him}		Сынывоплъ {I look at y'all}	Соплъ {I look at them}	Сызоплъыж {I look at myself}
You	Укъызоплъ {You look at me}		Уоплъ {You look at him}	Укъыдоплъ {You look at us}		Уоплъ {You look at them}	Узоплъыж {You look at yourself}
He	Къызоплъ {He looks at me}	Къоплъ {He looks at you}	Йоплъ {He looks at him}	Къыдоплъ {He looks at us}	Къывоплъ {He looks at y'all}	Йоплъ {He looks at them}	Зоплъыж {He looks at himself}
We		Дыноплъ {We look at you}	Доплъ {We look at him}		Дынывоплъ {We look at y'all}	Доплъ {We look at them}	Дызоплъыж {We look at ourselves}
Y'all	Фыкъызоплъ {Y'all look at me}		Фоплъ {Y'all look at him}	Фыкъыдоплъ {Y'all look at us}		Фоплъ {Y'all look at them}	Фызоплъыж {Y'all look at yourselves}
They	Къызоплъ(хэ) {They look at me}	Къоплъ(хэ) {They look at you}	Йоплъ(хэ) {They look at him}	Къыдоплъ(хэ) {They look at us}	Къыводоплъ(хэ) {They look at y'all}	Йоплъ(хэ) {They look at them}	Зоплъыж(хэ) {They look at themselves}

Notice that, as explained above, the cells "at him" and "at them" are identical (Соплъ, Йоплъ, etc.), since standard verbs in Kabardian do not distinguish 3SG and 3PL in the oblique series of intransitive bivalent verbs due to the dynamic present-tense vowel.

Verbs with spatial preverbs: preserving the 3PL object

While standard bivalent intransitive verbs lack a distinction between 3SG and 3PL objects because the dynamic -о- swallows the prefix, verbs that use spatial preverbs (like пэ-, хэ-, те-) maintain this distinction. Because the preverb sits between the object prefix and the dynamic vowel, the 3PL oblique prefix а- remains clearly visible.

- Абыхэм щ1алэр къапоплъэ. — "The boy is waiting for them." (Note: The subject "жыхьэнмэр" is absolutive, and the 3PL object "абыхэм" is oblique. The verb features the directional къ- + 3PL object prefix а- + preverb пэ- + dynamic -о- + root плъэ). Contrast this with a 3SG object form къыпоплъэ ("waiting for him").
- Сэ абыхэм сахоплъэ. — "I look among them." (сы-а-х-о-плъэ : 1SG.SUBJ сы- + 3PL.OBJ а- + preverb хэ- + dynamic -о- + root плъэ).
- Си 1уэхук1э сэ унащхьэхэм сатоплъэ. — "Because of my business, I look upon the roofs." (сы-а-т-о-плъэ : 1SG.SUBJ сы- + 3PL.OBJ а- + preverb те- [which drops its vowel to become т-] + dynamic -о- + root плъэ).

===== Additional examples (present intransitive bivalent) =====
To further clarify the usage of present bivalent intransitives, consider the root -джэ- (to read/study) and other verbs in context:

- Соджэ — "I read / I am studying" (с-о-джэ)
- Йоджэ — "He reads / He is studying" (й-о-джэ)
- Щ1алэр тхылъым йоджэ. — "The boy reads the book." (Notice how the subject "щ1алэр" is in the absolutive, and the object "тхылъым" takes the oblique case.)
- Сэ тхылъым соджэ. — "I read the book."
- Зыгуэрк1э сыноупщ1мэ, жэуап пэжыр псынщ1у къызот. — "If I ask you about something, you quickly give me the true answer." (Note that the conditional suffix -мэ ("if") strips away the dynamic present-tense prefix -о-. The "о" visible in сыноупщ1мэ is not the dynamic prefix; it is simply the phonetic contraction of the 2nd-person singular object pronoun уэ (сы-ны-уэ-упщ1-мэ). We can verify this by switching the object to the 2nd-person plural (вэ), which yields сынывэупщ1мэ ("if I ask y'all"). The "о" completely vanishes, proving the dynamic prefix is indeed absent.)

==== Past ====
The Kabardian past-tense suffix for bivalent intransitives is -ащ. Again, the 3SG and 3PL oblique forms are identical (no я- is used) in standard verbs without preverbs.

Conjugation of еплъащ (looked at)
Subject (Abs)	Object (Oblique)						
Subject (Abs)	At me	At you	At him	At us	At y'all	At them	At oneself
I		Сыноплъащ {I looked at you}	Сеплъащ {I looked at him}		Сынывэплъащ {I looked at y'all}	Сеплъащ {I looked at them}	Сызэплъыжащ {I looked at myself}
You	Укъызэплъащ {You looked at me}		Уеплъащ {You looked at him}	Укъыдэплъащ {You looked at us}		Уеплъащ {You looked at them}	Узэплъыжащ {You looked at yourself}
He	Къызэплъащ {He looked at me}	Къоплъащ {He looked at you}	Еплъащ {He looked at him}	Къыдэплъащ {He looked at us}	Къывэплъащ {He looked at y'all}	Еплъащ {He looked at them}	Зэплъыжащ {He looked at himself}
We		Дыноплъащ {We looked at you}	Деплъащ {We looked at him}		Дынывэплъащ {We looked at y'all}	Деплъащ {We looked at them}	Дызэплъыжащ {We looked at ourselves}
Y'all	Фыкъызэплъащ {Y'all looked at me}		Феплъащ {Y'all looked at him}	Фыкъыдэплъащ {Y'all looked at us}		Феплъащ {Y'all looked at them}	Фызэплъыжащ {Y'all looked at yourselves}
They	Къызэплъа(хэ)щ {They looked at me}	Къоплъа(хэ)щ {They looked at you}	Еплъа(хэ)щ {They looked at him}	Къыдэплъа(хэ)щ {They looked at us}	Къывэплъа(хэ)щ {They looked at y'all}	Еплъа(хэ)щ {They looked at them}	Зэплъыжа(хэ)щ {They looked at themselves}

Distinguishing the dynamic о- from the 2nd-person pronoun уэ.

In the past tense, there is no dynamic present-tense о-. It is critical not to confuse the dynamic present-tense о- with the phonetic contraction of the 2nd person singular pronoun уэ- in the past tense. Consider:

- Сыноплъащ "I looked at you" ← derived from Сы-ны-уэ-плъ-ащ.
- Къоплъащ "He looked at you" ← derived from Къы-уэ-плъ-ащ.

We can prove that this о is purely the 2nd person pronoun (and not the dynamic present prefix) by replacing the "you" object with "me" (1SG, сэ-) or "y'all" (2PL, вэ-). When we do this, the о completely disappears, revealing the true past-tense structure without any dynamic prefix:

- Къызэплъащ "He looked at me"
- Сынывэплъащ "I looked at y'all"
- Къывэплъащ "He looked at y'all"

This diagnostic is useful throughout the Kabardian verbal system whenever one sees an "о" next to a 2nd person argument.

===== Additional examples (past / spatial Contexts) =====
- Си гъусэу унежьэмэ, зык1и укъызэмыупщ1. — "If you set out with me, do not ask me anything at all." (Features the bivalent intransitive root in a negative imperative context: у-къы-зэ-мы-упщ1 "you-CIS-to.me-NEG-ask").
- Дыгъуасэ сэ тхылъыхэм сяджащ. — "Yesterday I read the books." (Note: The verb еджэн inherently uses the indirect object prefixes е- (singular) and я- (plural) rather than a spatial preverb. Therefore, the 1SG past plural is correctly formed as сяджащ [с-я-дж-а-щ], rather than *саджащ).
- Ц1ыхухэм сахэплъащ. — "I looked among the people." (сы-а-хэ-плъ-а-щ. A perfect past-tense construction maintaining the 3PL prefix а- with the хэ- preverb).
- Сэ нобэ жылэм и унащ1эхэм сарихьащ скъаплъынущ. — "Today I entered the village's new houses, I will look at them." (Features the past tense сарихьащ [сы-а-ры-хь-а-щ, "I entered among them"] alongside the future tense скъаплъынущ [сы-къ-а-плъ-ын-у-щ]).

=== Transitive bivalent verbs ===
==== Present ====
The Kabardian verb лъагъун "to see" is transitive: its subject is ergative and its object is absolutive. The slot order in the prefix chain is therefore:

[Object (abs)] – (optional cislocative къы-/къэ-) – [Subject (erg)] – (dynamic -о-) – [Root]

Here the object is absolutive (a core argument, not an oblique), so the hierarchy 1st ≥ 2nd > 3rd has a weaker grip: it is more optional than in the semi-mandatory intransitive, with no categorical inverse split. Kabardian does, though, still extend the directional to a local (1st/2nd-person) object — hence къ- in Сыкъелъагъу "he sees me" and Укъелъагъу "he sees you".

Conjugation of лъагъун (to see)
Subject (Ergative)	Object (Abs)						
Subject (Ergative)	Me	You	Him/It	Us	Y'all	Them	Oneself
I		Узолъагъу {I see you}	Солъагъу {I see him}		Фызолъагъу {I see y'all}	Солъагъу(хэ) {I see them}	Зысолъэгъужы {I see myself}
You	Сыболъагъу {You see me}		Болъагъу; Уолъагъу {You see him}	Дыболъагъу {You see us}		Болъагъу(хэ); Уолъагъу(хэ) {You see them}	Зыболъэгъуж {You see yourself}
He	Сыкъелъагъу {He sees me}	Укъелъагъу {He sees you}	Елъагъу {He sees him}	Дыкъелъагъу {He sees us}	Фыкъелъагъу {He sees y'all}	Елъагъу(хэ) {He sees them}	Зелъэгъуж {He sees himself}
We		Удолъагъу {We see you}	Долъагъу {We see him}		Фыдолъагъу {We see y'all}	Долъагъу(хэ) {We see them}	Зыдолъэгъуж {We see ourselves}
Y'all	Сыволъагъу {Y'all see me}		Фолъагъу {Y'all see him}	Дыволъагъу {Y'all see us}		Фолъагъу(хэ) {Y'all see them}	Зыволъэгъуж {Y'all see yourselves}
They	Сыкъалъагъу {They see me}	Укъалъагъу {They see you}	Ялъагъу {They see him}	Дыкъалъагъу {They see us}	Фыкъалъагъу {They see y'all}	Ялъагъу(хэ) {They see them}	Залъэгъуж {They see themselves}

Note that the 3PL ergative prefix я- (< а-) does appear here – for example in Ялъагъу "they see him" – unlike in the intransitive bivalent paradigm.

===== Additional examples (present transitive bivalent) =====
Here are further examples demonstrating present-tense transitive structures:

- Л1ым бийр еук1. — "The man kills the enemy." (ergative subject "л1ым", absolutive object "бийр". The verb еук1 marks the 3SG agent).
- Тхылъыр абыхэм ятх. — "They write the book." (The 3PL agent is clearly marked by the ergative я-).

==== Past ====
In the past tense, the dynamic present-tense marker -о- disappears, so the "pure" ergative prefixes become visible. The 1SG ergative с-, the 2SG ergative п-, the 1PL ergative т- (< д- by devoicing, see below), the 2PL ergative ф-, the 3SG ergative и-, and the 3PL ergative я- all appear immediately before the root. The past-tense suffix is -ащ.

Conjugation of лъэгъуащ (saw)
Subject (Ergative)	Object (Abs)						
Subject (Ergative)	Me	You	Him	Us	Y'all	Them	Oneself
I		Услъэгъуащ {I saw you}	Слъэгъуащ {I saw him}		Фыслъэгъуащ {I saw y'all}	Слъэгъуа(хэ)щ {I saw them}	Зыслъэгъужащ {I saw myself}
You	Сыплъэгъуащ {You saw me}		Плъэгъуащ; Улъэгъуащ {You saw him}	Дыплъэгъуащ {You saw us}		Плъэгъуа(хэ)щ; Улъэгъуа(хэ)щ {You saw them}	Зыплъэгъужащ {You saw yourself}
He	Сыкъилъэгъуащ {He saw me}	Укъилъэгъуащ {He saw you}	Илъэгъуащ {He saw him}	Дыкъилъэгъуащ {He saw us}	Фыкъилъэгъуащ {He saw y'all}	Илъэгъуа(хэ)щ {He saw them}	Зилъэгъужащ {He saw himself}
We		Утлъэгъуащ {We saw you}	Тлъэгъуащ {We saw him}		Фытлъэгъуащ {We saw y'all}	Тлъэгъуа(хэ)щ {We saw them}	Зытлъэгъужащ {We saw ourselves}
Y'all	Сыфлъэгъуащ {Y'all saw me}		Флъэгъуащ {Y'all saw him}	Дыфлъэгъуащ {Y'all saw us}		Флъэгъуа(хэ)щ {Y'all saw them}	Зыфлъэгъужащ {Y'all saw yourselves}
They	Сыкъалъэгъуащ {They saw me}	Укъалъэгъуащ {They saw you}	Ялъэгъуащ {They saw him}	Дыкъалъэгъуащ {They saw us}	Фыкъалъэгъуащ {They saw y'all}	Ялъэгъуа(хэ)щ {They saw them}	Залъэгъужащ {They saw themselves}

Note on pronunciation and spelling. In the past-tense transitive conjugation, the 1st-person plural ergative prefix д- becomes the voiceless т- because it precedes the voiceless lateral fricative лъ (e.g. тлъэгъуащ instead of the underlying длъэгъуащ).

===== Additional examples (past transitive bivalent) =====
In the past tense, the forms reflect completed actions without the dynamic -о-:

- Л1ым бийр иук1ащ. — "The man killed the enemy." (The 3SG past ergative is marked by и-, yielding иук1ащ).
- Тхылъыр абыхэм ятхащ. — "They wrote the book." (The 3PL ergative я- with the past suffix -ащ).
- Хьащ1эхэр елъэ1уащ къуаджэдэсхэм ягъэшхэну, ауэ къуаджэдэсхэм ягъэхьэщ1эн ядакъым. — "The guests begged the villagers to feed them, but the villagers refused to host them." (A complex sentence featuring past transitive actions like ядакъым "they did not agree/allow", driven by the 3PL ergative я-, and the causative past ягъэшхэну).

== Dynamic and static verbs ==
Kabardian verbs can be either dynamic or static.

Dynamic verbs express the process of actions that are taking place, which is the natural role of verbs in English:

Сэ сожэ: "I am running";
Сэ сокӀуэ: "I am going",
Сэ солъэгъу: "I am seeing it",
Сэ жызоӀэ: "I am saying it".

Static verbs express states or results of actions:

Сэ сыщытщ: "I am standing",
Сэ сыщылъщ: "I am lying.",
Сэ сыпхъащӀщ: "I am a carpenter",
Сэ сытрактористщ: "I am a tractor-driver".

== Participles ==
Participles are verb forms that function as nouns or noun modifiers, referring to one of the verb's arguments (subject, object, indirect object) or to circumstances of the action (time, place, manner, reason). Kabardian has a rich participle morphology.

Participles in Kabardian are formed by adding noun case markers (absolutive -р, oblique/ergative -м, instrumental -кӀэ, adverbial -у) directly to the verb form. This turns the verb into a noun or adjective (e.g., "the one who walks," "the sitting one").

=== Overview: valency and arguments ===
To understand Kabardian participles, it is essential to first understand the valency of the verb (the number of arguments it takes) and the grammatical case of each argument:

- monovalent intransitive verbs have only one argument: an absolutive subject.
- bivalent intransitive verbs have two arguments: an absolutive subject and an oblique object.
- bivalent transitive verbs have two arguments: an ergative subject and an absolutive object.
- trivalent transitive verbs have three arguments: an ergative subject, an absolutive direct object, and an oblique indirect object.

Verb Type	Example Sentence	Gloss
Monovalent intransitive	ЩӀалэр макӀуэ	Boy-ABS goes — "The boy goes"
Bivalent intransitive	ЩӀалэр тхылъым йоджэ	Boy-ABS book-OBL reads — "The boy reads the book"
Bivalent transitive	ЩӀалэм тхылъыр елъагъу	Boy-ERG book-ABS sees — "The boy sees the book"
Trivalent transitive	ЩӀалэм хъыджэбзым тхылъыр иритащ	Boy-ERG girl-OBL book-ABS gave — "The boy gave the book to the girl"

=== Dynamic and static verbs in participles ===
Unlike Adyghe, which retains the dynamic suffix -рэ from Proto-Circassian in present tense participles, Kabardian has generalized the forms without this suffix. As a result the case marker attaches directly to the verb stem or tense suffix in both dynamic and static verbs.

Tense	Verb Form	Participle	Breakdown	Gloss	Translation
Present (dynamic)	МакӀуэ	КӀуэр	кӀуэ-р	go-ABS	"The one who is going."
Present (static)	Щыс	Щысыр	щыс-ыр	sit-ABS	"The one who is sitting."
Past	Илъэгъуащ	Илъэгъуам	и-лъэгъу-а-м	3SG.ERG-see-PST-OBL	"(to) The one who saw it."
Future	Езытынущ	Езытынур	е-зы-ты-ну-р	DAT-ERG.PTCP-give-FUT-ABS	"The thing I will give to him."

=== Argument participles ===
Any argument of a verb can become the pivot of a participle. The grammatical role of the participle is determined by its morphology:

- The base form of the participle (no prefix) refers to the absolutive argument – i.e., the subject of an intransitive verb or the direct object of a transitive verb.
- The prefix зы- (or з- before a vowel) marks the ergative or oblique argument – i.e., the subject of a transitive verb, or an object marked by a preverb.

Participles themselves can take case endings: -р (absolutive) and -м (oblique/ergative), depending on the role the participle plays in the larger sentence.

==== Monovalent intransitive verbs ====
The sole argument (the absolutive subject) is referenced by the base participle.

Verb	Participle	Meaning
кӀуэн "to go"	кӀуэр / кӀуэм (present) кӀуар / кӀуам (past)	"the one who goes" / "the one who went"
жэн "to run"	жэр / жэм (present) жар / жам (past)	"the one who runs" / "the one who ran"

Sentence	Gloss	Translation
ЩӀалэр макӀуэ	Boy-ABS goes	"The boy goes."
КӀуэр щӀалэщ	Goer is-boy	"The one who goes is the boy."
ЩӀалэр кӀуащ	Boy-ABS went	"The boy went."
КӀуар щӀалэщ	Gone.one is-boy	"The one who went is the boy."
ЩӀалэр мажэ	Boy-ABS runs	"The boy runs."
Жэр щӀалэщ	Runner is-boy	"The one who runs is the boy."
ЩӀалэр жащ	Boy-ABS ran	"The boy ran."
Жар щӀалэщ	Ran.one is-boy	"The one who ran is the boy."

==== Bivalent intransitive verbs ====
These verbs have an absolutive subject and an oblique object. Both arguments can be expressed as participles, distinguished by the absence or presence of зы-. Note that in the third person present tense, these verbs typically take the form йо- (e.g., йоджэ, йоплъ).

Verb	Absolutive Participle	Oblique Participle (зы-)
еджэн "to read (something)"	еджэр / еджэм (pres.) еджар / еджам (past) "the one who reads"	зэджэр / зэджэм (pres.) зэджар / зэджам (past) "the thing that is being read"
еплъын "to look at (something)"	еплъыр / еплъым (pres.) еплъар / еплъам (past) "the one who looks at it"	зэплъыр / зэплъым (pres.) зэплъар / зэплъам (past) "the thing that is being looked at"

Sentence	Gloss	Translation
ЩӀалэр тхылъым йоджэ	Boy-ABS book-OBL reads	"The boy reads the book."
Еджэр щӀалэщ	Reader is-boy	"The one who reads is the boy." (absolutive subject)
Зэджэр тхылъщ	That-which-is-read is-book	"The thing being read is the book." (oblique object)
ЩӀалэр тхылъым еджащ	Boy-ABS book-OBL read	"The boy read the book."
Еджар щӀалэщ	Reader is-boy	"The one who read is the boy."
Зэджар тхылъщ	That-which-was-read is-book	"The thing that was read is the book."
ЩӀалэр сурэтым йоплъ	Boy-ABS picture-OBL looks.at	"The boy looks at the picture."
Еплъыр щӀалэщ	Looker is-boy	"The one who looks is the boy."
Зэплъыр сурэтщ	That-which-is-looked.at is-picture	"The thing being looked at is the picture."
ЩӀалэр сурэтым еплъащ	Boy-ABS picture-OBL looked.at	"The boy looked at the picture."
Еплъар щӀалэщ	Looker is-boy	"The one who looked is the boy."
Зэплъар сурэтщ	That-which-was-looked.at is-picture	"The thing looked at is the picture."

==== Bivalent transitive verbs ====
These verbs have an ergative subject and an absolutive object. The base form refers to the absolutive (the object being acted upon), while зы- marks the ergative (the one performing the action).

Verb	Absolutive Participle	Ergative Participle (зы-)
лъагъун "to see (something)"	илъагъур / илъагъум (pres.) илъэгъуар / илъэгъуам (past) "the one being seen"	зылъагъур / зылъагъум (pres.) зылъэгъуар / зылъэгъуам (past) "the one who sees it"
шэн "to lead (someone)"	ишэр / ишэм (pres.) ишар / ишам (past) "the one being led"	зышэр / зышэм (pres.) зышар / зышам (past) "the one who leads"

Sentence	Gloss	Translation
ЩӀалэм хъыджэбзыр елъагъу	Boy-ERG girl-ABS sees	"The boy sees the girl."
Илъагъур хъыджэбзщ	That-which-is-seen is-girl	"The one being seen is the girl." (absolutive object)
Зылъагъур щӀалэщ	Seer is-boy	"The one who sees is the boy." (ergative subject)
ЩӀалэм хъыджэбзыр илъэгъуащ	Boy-ERG girl-ABS saw	"The boy saw the girl."
Илъэгъуар хъыджэбзщ	That-which-was-seen is-girl	"The one who was seen is the girl."
Зылъэгъуар щӀалэщ	Seer is-boy	"The one who saw is the boy."
ЛӀым шыр ешэ	Man-ERG horse-ABS leads	"The man leads the horse."
Ишэр шыщ	That-which-is-led is-horse	"The one being led is the horse."
Зышэр лӀыщ	Leader is-man	"The one who leads is the man."
ЛӀым шыр ишащ	Man-ERG horse-ABS led	"The man led the horse."
Ишар шыщ	That-which-was-led is-horse	"The one that was led is the horse."
Зышар лӀыщ	Leader is-man	"The one who led is the man."

==== Trivalent transitive verbs ====
These verbs have an ergative subject, an absolutive direct object, and an oblique indirect object. The base form refers to the absolutive (the item being given, told, etc.), while зы- marks both the ergative subject and the oblique recipient.

Verb	Absolutive Participle	Ergative/Oblique Participle (зы-)
етын "to give (something to someone)"	иритыр / иритым (pres.) иритар / иритам (past) "the thing being given"	зритыр / зритым (pres.) зритар / зритам (past) "the one who gives / the recipient"
жыӀэн "to say (something to someone)"	жиӀэр / жиӀэм (pres.) жиӀар / жиӀам (past) "that which is said"	жызыӀэр / жызыӀэм (pres.) жызыӀар / жызыӀам (past) "the one who says it"

Sentence	Gloss	Translation
ЩӀалэм хъыджэбзым тхылъыр ирет	Boy-ERG girl-OBL book-ABS gives	"The boy gives the book to the girl."
Иритыр тхылъщ	That-which-is-given is-book	"The thing being given is the book." (absolutive)
Езытыр щӀалэщ	Giver is-boy	"The one who gives is the boy." (ergative)
Зритыр хъыджэбзщ	Recipient is-girl	"The one to whom it is given is the girl." (oblique)
ЩӀалэм хъыджэбзым тхылъыр иритащ	Boy-ERG girl-OBL book-ABS gave	"The boy gave the book to the girl."
Иритар тхылъщ	That-which-was-given is-book	"The thing given was the book."
Езытар щӀалэщ	Giver is-boy	"The one who gave is the boy."
Зритар хъыджэбзщ	Recipient is-girl	"The one to whom it was given is the girl."
ЩӀалэм хъыджэбзым псалъэ хъарзынэр жреӀэ	Boy-ERG girl-OBL nice-word-ABS says	"The boy says a nice word to the girl."
ЖиӀэр псалъэ хъарзынэщ	That-which-is-said is-nice-word	"What is being said is a nice word."
ЖызыӀэр щӀалэщ	Sayer is-boy	"The one who says it is the boy."
ЩӀалэм хъыджэбзым псалъэ хъарзынэр жриӀащ	Boy-ERG girl-OBL nice-word-ABS said	"The boy said a nice word to the girl."
ЖиӀар псалъэ хъарзынэщ	That-which-was-said is-nice-word	"What was said is a nice word."
ЖызыӀар щӀалэщ	Sayer is-boy	"The one who said it is the boy."
Хасэм лӀым упщӀэжыр ирихьэлӀащ	Counsel-OBL man-ERG advice-ABS gave	"The man gave advice in the counsel."
ЕзыхьэлӀар лӀыр	Giver is-man	"The one who gave is the man."

=== Specifying the referent with the adverbial case -у ===
When a participle stands alone it refers generically to "the one who…" or "that which…". To specify exactly what or who the participle refers to, the relevant noun is marked with the adverbial case -у [-əw]. The participle then acts as a relative clause modifying that noun.

The key insight is that the noun marked with -у is the referent of the participle, even if it does not stand directly adjacent to the participle in the sentence. Because only one noun in the clause carries -у there is no ambiguity about which noun the participle describes.

In the examples below the noun bearing the adverbial case -у is marked in green.

Sentence	Translation
ЩӀалэу кӀуэр дахэщ	"The boy that's going is beautiful."
ЩӀалэу еджэр дахэщ	"The boy that is reading is beautiful."
ЩӀалэу тхылъым еджэр дахэщ	"The boy that reads the book is beautiful."
ЩӀалэр Тхылъу зэджэр дахэщ	"The book that the boy reads is beautiful."
Абы Тхылъу зэджэм сэри седжащ	"I also read the book that (s)he reads."
Хъыджэбзу щӀалэм илъэгъуар дахэщ	"The girl the boy saw is beautiful."
ЩӀалэу хъыджэбзыр зылъэгъуар дахэщ	"The boy that saw the girl is beautiful."
Хъыджэбзу щӀалэм илъэгъуам сыхуэзащ	"I met the girl that the boy saw."
ЩӀалэу хъыджэбзыр зылъэгъуам сыхуэзащ	"I met the boy that saw the girl."

In sentences like ЩӀалэу хъыджэбзыр зылъэгъуам сыхуэзащ the noun щӀалэу and its participle зылъэгъуам are separated by another noun phrase (хъыджэбзыр), yet the sentence remains unambiguous since only щӀалэу bears the adverbial case, indicating the participle must refer to it.

=== Circumstantial participles ===
In addition to argument participles Kabardian has participles that refer to circumstances of the action rather than to its arguments. These are formed by adding specific prefixes to the verb.

==== Temporal participle щы- ====
Marked by щы-, this participle denotes the time (and sometimes the location) at which an action takes place.

Sentence	Translation
Ар щылажьэр унэрщ	"Where he works is (at) home."
Ар щылажьэр сощӀэ	"I know where/when he works."
Уэ укъыщыкӀуэжам щыгъуэ сэ унэм сыщыӀакъым	"I wasn't home when you arrived."
Си шыпхъур къыщалъхуам щыгъуэ сэ илъэсибл сыхъуат	"When my sister was born, I was already seven years old."
Сыщилъагъум, ар жащ	"When he saw me, he ran away."

==== Locative participle здэ- ====
Marked by здэ-, this participle denotes the place at which an action occurs.

Sentence	Translation
Сэ здэсыпсэур Налшыкщ	"Where I live is Nalchik."
Ар здэлэжьар заводырщ	"Where he worked is the factory."

==== Manner participle зэры- ====
Marked by зэры-, this participle denotes the manner in which an action is performed.

Sentence	Translation
Абы зэрыпсалъэр дахэщ	"The way he speaks is beautiful."
Абы зэрилэжьар тщӀэркъым	"We don't know how he did it."

==== Reason participle щӀэ- ====
Marked by щӀэ-, this participle denotes the reason for which an action is performed.

Sentence	Translation
Ар щӀэлажьэр и унагъуэрщ	"The reason he works is his family."
Ар щӀэкӀуар ныбжьэгъурщ	"The reason he went was a friend."

== Masdar ==
Ii the Kabardian language a masdar – a form of verb close to a gerund – is expressed with the suffix -н:

тхы-н "a write (writing)",
жэ-н "a run (running)",
щтэ-н "a take (taking)",
псэлъэ-н "a talk (talking)",
дзы-н "a throw (throwing)".

Masdar has grammatical cases:

absolutive жэны-р,
ergative жэны-м,
instrumental жэны-м-кӀэ,
adverbial жэн-у

and different forms for different person:

сы-жэн "I will run",
у-жэн "you will run",
жэн "he will run".

== Negative form ==
In the Kabardian language the negative form of a verb is expressed through different morphemes (prefixes and suffixes) depending on the mood, tense, and form of the verb.

=== The suffix -къым (indicative statements) ===
In finite verbs, the negative meaning is typically expressed with the suffix -къым. This suffix is attached at the end of the verb, usually following the tense suffixes. It is primarily used to negate standard declarative statements.

Below is a table demonstrating the negative conjugation of five verbs—тэджын (to get up), кIуэн (to go), лъэгъун (to see), плъэн (to look), and къыгурыIуэн (to understand)—in the first and third persons across the present, past, and future tenses:

Verb (Infinitive)	Person	Present	Past	Future
тэджын (to get up)	1st Person	сытэджыркъым	сытэджакъым	сытэджынукъым
тэджын (to get up)	3rd Person	тэджыркъым	тэджакъым	тэджынукъым
кIуэн (to go)	1st Person	сыкIуэркъым	сыкIуакъым	сыкIуэнукъым
кIуэн (to go)	3rd Person	кIуэркъым	кIуакъым	кIуэнукъым
лъэгъун (to see)	1st Person	слъагъуркъым	слъэгъуакъым	слъэгъунукъым
лъэгъун (to see)	3rd Person	илъагъуркъым	илъэгъуакъым	илъэгъунукъым
плъэн (to look)	1st Person	сыплъэркъым	сыплъакъым	сыплъэнукъым
плъэн (to look)	3rd Person	плъэркъым	плъакъым	плъэнукъым
къыгурыIуэн (to understand)	1st Person	къызгурыIуэркъым	къызгурыIуакъым	къызгурыIуэнукъым
къыгурыIуэн (to understand)	3rd Person	къыгурыIуэркъым	къыгурыIуакъым	къыгурыIуэнукъым

=== The prefix -мы- (commands, conditionals, and participles) ===
In participles, adverbial participles, masdars, imperatives (commands), interrogatives, and other dependent verb forms, negation is expressed with the prefix -мы-. This prefix usually attaches directly before the root morpheme that carries the main lexical meaning.

The prefix -мы- is specifically required when:

- issuing a command (e.g., :у-мы-тх "you don't write / do not write", :у-мы-кӀу "you don't go / do not go").
- using conditional suffixes. For example, when adding -мэ ("if"), -ми ("even if"), and -и ("and"):
  - :сы-къы-пхуэ-мы-щэмэ "if you can't bring me"
  - :у-къа-мы-гъа-кIуэмэ "if you aren't forced to come"
- forming participles and adding particles.

The use of vowels and pronominal prefixes in conjunction with the negative -мы- changes depending on whether the verb is intransitive or transitive.

==== Intransitive ====
Intransitive verbs focus on the action generally, without a specific direct object.

Examples with conditionals:

- сэ сымытхэмэ — if I don't write
- ар мытхэмэ — if (s)he doesn't write
- сэ сымыкIуэмэ — if I don't go
- ар мыкIуэмэ — if (s)he doesn't go
- сэ семыджэмэ — if I don't read / study
- ар емыджэмэ — if (s)he doesn't read / study
- сэ абы семыплъымэ — if I don't look at it
- ар абы емыплъымэ — if (s)he doesn't look at it

Examples with participles:

- мытхэр — the one who does not write (present)
- мытхар — the one who did not write (past)
- мытхэнур — the one who will not write (future)

==== Transitive ====
Transitive verbs focus on an action directed at a specific object.

Examples with conditionals:

- сэ ар сымытхымэ — if I don't write it
- абы ар имытхымэ — if (s)he doesn't write it
- сэ ар сымылъэгъумэ — if I don't see it
- абы ар имылъэгъумэ — if (s)he doesn't see it
- сэ ар сымылъэгъуамэ — if I didn't see it
- абы ар имылъэгъуамэ — if (s)he didn't see it

Examples with participles:

- сымытхыр — what I don't write (present)
- имытхыр — what (s)he doesn't write (present)
- зимытхыр — the one who doesn't write it (present, relative)
- сымытхар — what I didn't write (past)
- имытхар — what (s)he didn't write (past)
- зимытхар — the one who didn't write it (past, relative)
- сымытхынур — what I will not write (future)
- имытхынур — what (s)he will not write (future)
- зимытхынур — the one who will not write it (future, relative)

== Tense ==
Tense	Suffix	Example	Meaning
Present	~∅	макӀуэ [maːkʷʼa]	(s)he is going; (s)he goes
Simple past	~ащ [~aːɕ]	кӀуащ [kʷʼaːɕ]	(s)he went
Discontinuous past	~ат [~aːt]	кӀуат [kʷʼaːt]	(s)he went (but is not there anymore)
Pluperfect	~ат [~aːt]	кӀуат [kʷʼaːt]	(s)he had gone
Remote past	~ат [~aːt] / ~гъащ [~ʁaːɕ]	кӀуат [kʷʼaːt] / кӀуэгъащ [kʷʼaʁaːɕ]	(s)he went back then / a long time ago
Past of the distant past (remote pluperfect)	~гъат [~ʁaːt]	кӀуэгъат [kʷʼaʁaːt]	(s)he had gone a long time ago
Categorical future	~нщ [~nɕ]	кӀуэнщ [kʷʼanɕ]	(s)he will go
Factual future	~нущ [~nəwɕ]	кӀуэнущ [kʷʼanəwɕ]	(s)he will go; (s)he is about to go
Imperfect	~(р)т [~(r)t]	кӀуэ(р)т [kʷʼa(r)t]	(s)he was going; (s)he used to go
Conditional perfect	~нт [~nt] / ~нут [~nəwt]	кӀуэнт [kʷʼant] / кӀуэнут [kʷʼanəwt]	(s)he would have gone
Future perfect	~гъахэнущ	кӀуэгъахэнущ	(s)he will have gone

=== Present tense ===
The Kabardian present has no tense suffix of its own. Instead it is marked by the dynamic prefix, descending from Proto-Circassian *уэ- and surfacing as -о- immediately before the verb root. This prefix appears only in positive present dynamic forms; it is absent in the past and future, in negatives, and in mood-marked forms. Unlike the Adyghe -э-, Kabardian -о- frequently blends with — or is "swallowed" by — adjacent vowels, fusing with personal prefixes to give со-, уо-, до-, фо-. An underlying dynamic suffix *-р also belongs to the present: it surfaces as -р before another suffix but is silent when word-final.

The present covers both the simple present (habits, general facts) and the present continuous (action in progress). It is the context which decides, e.g. солажьэ "I work" or "I am working", софэ (in тутын софэ) "I smoke" or "I am smoking".

In modern spoken Kabardian the dynamic suffix -р is increasingly dropped even when not word-final, especially before the negative -къым, as in standard сыкӀуэркъым "I am not going" → spoken сыкӀуэкъым; слъагъуркъым → слъагъукъым.

==== Disappearance of the dynamic prefix ====
The dynamic prefix surfaces only when the verb is at once present, positive, and mood-less. If any one of these fails – a shift to past or future, a negative, or a mood such as the conditional – the prefix -о- simply vanishes, leaving the personal prefix (сы-) or its bare consonant (с-) directly on the root. The potential suffix -ф and the repetitive suffix -ж are not moods and leave the verb in the present, so the prefix is retained beside them.

Retention vs. dropping of the dynamic prefix ("to go")
Grammatical context	1st sg. ("I go")	3rd sg. ("(s)he goes")
Present positive (prefix active)	сокӀуэ с-о-кӀуэ	мэкӀуэ мэ-кӀуэ
Present + potential (retained)	сокӀуэф с-о-кӀуэ-ф	мэкӀуэф мэ-кӀуэ-ф
Present + repetitive (retained)	сокӀуэж с-о-кӀуэ-ж	мэкӀуэж мэ-кӀуэ-ж
Past (drops)	скӀуащ с-кӀу-ащ	кӀуащ ∅-кӀу-ащ
Future (drops)	скӀуэнущ с-кӀу-энущ	кӀуэнущ ∅-кӀу-энущ
Negative (drops)	сыкӀуэркъым сы-кӀуэ-р-къым	кӀуэркъым ∅-кӀуэ-р-къым
Conditional (drops)	сыкӀуэмэ сы-кӀуэ-мэ	кӀуэмэ ∅-кӀуэ-мэ

In the third person there is no overt personal prefix, so the prefix would stand word-initially; because it cannot open a word as a bare vowel, it mutates to мэ- (e.g. ∅-о-кӀуэ → макӀуэ). This мэ- is the dynamic prefix in disguise, not a pronoun, so it too drops in the past, future, negative, and conditional.

==== Valency and the position of the prefix ====
The prefix always sits directly before the root, blending with adjacent vowels. The tables below pair the positive present (top) with the negative (bottom); the negative drops the prefix and the suffix -р resurfaces before the ending -къым. A Proto-Circassian column is added, with its negative using the old prefix *-мы- in the prefix slot.

Monovalent (intransitive) verbs take one argument; the prefix sits between the subject prefix and the root, fusing with it (с-о- → со-).

Monovalent intransitive present ("to go"), positive / negative
Person	Form	Underlying	Proto-Circassian (pos / neg)
1st sg.	сокӀуэ сыкӀуэркъым	с-о-кӀуэ сы-кӀуэ-р-къым	*сы-уэ-кӀуэ-р *сы-мы-кӀуэ-р
3rd sg.	макӀуэ кӀуэркъым	о-кӀуэ → мэ-кӀуэ кӀуэ-р-къым	*∅-уэ-кӀуэ-р *∅-мы-кӀуэ-р
3rd pl.	макӀуэ(х) кӀуэхэркъым	о-кӀуэ(-х) → мэ-кӀуэ(-х) кӀуэ-хэ-р-къым	*∅-уэ-кӀуэ-хэ-р *∅-мы-кӀуэ-хэ-р

Bivalent intransitive verbs take an absolutive subject and an oblique object; the prefix is no longer word-initial so it never mutates to мэ-. Kabardian inserts a relational element ны- (translocative н-) that Adyghe lacks; inverse combinations are marked by directional къы-.

Bivalent intransitive present ("to look at"), positive / negative
Meaning	Form	Underlying	Proto-Circassian (pos / neg)
1 → 3 "I look at him"	соплъ сеплъыркъым	сы-й-о-плъ сы-й-плъы-р-къым	*сы-йэ-уэ-плъы-р *сы-йэ-мы-плъы-р
1 → 2 "I look at you"	сыноплъ сыноплъыркъым	сы-ны-у-о-плъ сы-ны-у-плъы-р-къым	*сы-уы-уэ-плъы-р *сы-уы-мы-плъы-р
3 → 1 "(s)he looks at me"	къызоплъ къызэплъыркъым	∅-къы-зы-о-плъ ∅-къы-зы-плъы-р-къым	*∅-къы-сы-уэ-плъы-р *∅-къы-сы-мы-плъы-р

Bivalent transitive verbs have an ergative subject and absolutive object; the prefix follows the ergative marker. In the third person -о- is swallowed into е- (sg., from ∅-и-о-) and я- (pl., from ∅-я-о-); the negative exposes the bare ergative (и-).

Bivalent transitive present ("to see"), positive / negative
Meaning	Form	Underlying	Proto-Circassian (pos / neg)
1 → 3 "I see him"	солъагъу слъагъуркъым	∅-с-о-лъагъу ∅-с-лъагъу-р-къым	*∅-сы-уэ-лъагъу-р *∅-сы-мы-лъагъу-р
3 → 3 "(s)he sees him"	елъагъу илъагъуркъым	∅-и-о-лъагъу ∅-и-лъагъу-р-къым	*∅-йы-уэ-лъагъу-р *∅-йы-мы-лъагъу-р
3pl → 3 "they see him"	ялъагъу ялъагъуркъым	∅-я-лъагъу ∅-я-лъагъу-р-къым	*∅-я-уэ-лъагъу-р *∅-я-мы-лъагъу-р

Trivalent verbs (ergative subject, absolutive object, oblique indirect object) keep the prefix in the same slot before the root; inverse forms again take къ(ы)- at the front.

Trivalent present ("to give it"), positive / negative
Meaning	Form	Underlying	Proto-Circassian (pos / neg)
1 → 3 "I give it to him"	изот естыркъым	∅-и-с-о-т ∅-и-с-ты-р-къым	*∅-йэ-сы-уэ-ты-р *∅-йэ-сы-мы-ты-р
1 → 2 "I give it to you"	узот уэстыркъым	∅-у-с-о-т ∅-у-с-ты-р-къым	*уы-сы-уэ-ты-р *уы-сы-мы-ты-р

=== Past tenses ===
==== Simple past ====
The simple past, suffix ~ащ, is the neutral past, used for completed events without stressing present relevance: кӀуащ "(s)he went". Verbs in -э or -ы shift to -а- before the -щ; the dynamic prefix is always dropped.

Present	Simple past	Meaning
ар макӀуэ	ар кӀуащ	"He goes" → "He went"
абы ар еукӀ	абы ар иукӀащ	"He kills him" → "He killed him"

Conjugation of еджэн "to read": седжащ "I read (past)", negative седжакъым; 3rd sg. еджащ / еджакъым.

==== Pluperfect, discontinuous and remote past ====
A second past in ~ат covers three related readings, disambiguated by context: a true pluperfect ("had gone", anchored before another past event); a discontinuous past (the result no longer holds: Америкэм сыщыӀат "I was in America [but no longer]"); and a remote past ("back then, a long time ago" – relative, so it can even mean "way earlier today").

Present	Pluperfect	Meaning
ар макӀуэ	ар кӀуат	"He goes" → "He had gone (but is back)"
абы ар еукӀ	абы ар иукӀат	"He kills him" → "He had killed him"

==== Dedicated remote past: ~гъащ and ~гъат ====
Beyond the polysemous ~ат, Kabardian has a pair of dedicated remote-past tenses built with the remote-past marker -гъа- (the same element in the Adyghe suffix ~гъагъ):

- ~гъащ (-гъа- + assertive -щ) – distant past, "a long time ago": кӀуэгъащ "(s)he went long ago", сыкӀуэгъащ "I went long ago".
- ~гъат (-гъа- + past -т) – pluperfect of the distant past: кӀуэгъат "(s)he had gone long ago".

The pairs ~ащ / ~ат and ~гъащ / ~гъат are parallel: the -щ form is the plain assertive past, the -т form its pluperfect counterpart. Both ~гъащ and ~гъат correspond to the single Adyghe form ~гъагъ.

=== Future tenses ===
Kabardian has a factual future in ~нущ – a concrete plan or near-certain fact (кӀуэнущ "(s)he will go / is about to go") – and a categorical future in ~нщ with a slightly weaker certainty (кӀуэнщ "(s)he will go"). For transitive verbs the root vowel shifts (лъагъу- → лъэгъу-) before future suffixes.

Factual future ~нущ (positive / negative)
Person	еджэн (to read)	лъагъун (to see)
1st sg.	седжэнущ седжэнукъым	слъэгъунущ слъэгъунукъым
3rd sg.	еджэнущ еджэнукъым	илъэгъунущ илъэгъунукъым

Categorical future ~нщ (positive / negative)
Person	еджэн (to read)	лъагъун (to see)
1st sg.	седжэнщ седжэнкъым	слъэгъунщ слъэгъункъым
3rd sg.	еджэнщ еджэнкъым	илъэгъунщ илъэгъункъым

A future perfect is formed by combining perfect and future elements, ~гъахэнущ, marking an action finished before a future point: седжэгъахэнущ "I will have read"; сыкъэщэгъахэнущ "I will already be married".

=== Imperfect ===
The imperfect adds ~(р)т: the variant ~рт appears on vowel-final (dynamic) stems (кӀуэрт "was going", сефэрт "used to drink"), plain ~т elsewhere. It has two readings, habitual ("used to") and continuous ("was ...ing").

Kabardian	Meaning
Тутын сефэрт ауэ иджы спортым сыпыхьащ.	"I used to smoke but now I am into sports." (habitual)
Тучаным сыкӀуэрт уэшх къыщыщӀидзэм.	"I was going to the shop when it started raining." (continuous)

The conditional perfect ("would have done") uses ~нт / ~нут (a future suffix plus the past -т), typically with a conditional clause: Университетым сыщеджагъэтэмэ, иджы лэжьапӀэ нэхъыфӀ сиӀэнут "If I had studied at university, I would have a better job now."

== Andative and venitive ==
Kabardian encodes the spatial orientation of an action directly on the verb. The venitive (also called cislocative) prefix къ(ы)~ (/qə-/) signals that the action is directed toward the deictic centre – the "here" of the speech situation – whereas its absence gives the andative reading: an action directed away (or spatially neutral). Compare:

- мэкӀуэ "(s)he goes (away)" → къокӀуэ "(s)he comes (here)"
- ехь "(s)he takes (away)" → къехь "(s)he brings (here)"

Unlike Adyghe, Kabardian also has a fully productive translocative prefix н(э)~ (/na-/) that marks the opposite pole – motion explicitly away from the centre – so that both directions can be made overt on almost any verb (see below).

=== The 1 > 2 > 3 hierarchy ===
Which participant counts as the "here" is not arbitrary: it is fixed by a deictic (empathy) hierarchy of

1st person (speaker) > 2nd person (addressee) > 3rd person (anyone else),

and the centre is always the highest-ranked participant in the clause.

The rule is then simple:

- if the action points up the hierarchy – toward the higher-ranked argument (the centre) – the verb takes the venitive къ(ы)~.
- if it points down – toward a lower-ranked argument – the bare andative form (or the translocative н~) is used.

Three consequences follow:

1. an action whose goal is the 1st person is maximally central and almost always carries къ~.
2. when one is speaking to someone, the centre may project onto the 2nd person.
3. when a speech-act participant (1 or 2) and a 3rd person interact, къ~ marks the "upward" direction (3 → 1/2) and therefore inverts the expected subject–object reading.

=== Action toward the centre (1st / 2nd person) ===
Because an action aimed at the speaker travels to the very top of the hierarchy the venitive is effectively obligatory there. This holds across every verb class.

Verb type	Andative (away / neutral)	Venitive (toward "me / here")
Motion	мэкӀуэ "(s)he goes"	къокӀуэ "(s)he comes here"
Transfer (give)	ты "give it"	къызот "give it to me"
Speech (say)	жыӀэ "say it"	къызоӀэ "say it to me"
Perception (look)	плъэ "look"	къызоплъ "look at me"
Carrying	хьы "carry it away"	къэхь "bring it to me"

None of the venitive motion/imperative forms needs an explicit "to me" object; grounding the action in the centre's "here" is enough to make the speaker the understood goal – just as English come! or bring it! defaults to "to me."

When the speaker is addressing someone, the same centre can project onto the 2nd person, so an action aimed at the addressee likewise takes къ~ (e.g. укъызоплъ "you look at me / toward here", with the addressee construed as the centre).

=== 3rd person: inverse marking ===
The hierarchy becomes most visible when a 1st/2nd person interacts with a 3rd person. Here къ~ does more than add direction – it swaps the perspective, because the action is now read as moving up the hierarchy (3 → 1/2) instead of down:

- Сыхуэдэщ "I am like him" → Къысхуэдэщ "he is like me"
- СыдокӀуэ "I go with him" → КъыздокӀуэ "he comes with me"

Дэ щӀалэм дыдокӀуэ, фэ пщащэр къыфдокӀуэ
Дэ щӀалэ-м ды-дэ-о-кӀуэ, фэ пщащэ-р къы-ф-дэ-о-кӀуэ
we boy-OBL 1PL-COM-DYN-go, you.PL girl-ABS VEN-2PL-COM-DYN-go
"We are going with the boy; the girl is coming with you."

=== 1st ↔ 2nd person: direction only, no inversion ===
Crucially, the role-swap happens only when a 3rd person is present. When the 1st and 2nd persons interact directly, neither is outranked by a third party, so къ~ contributes only a directional ("hither") nuance and leaves the subject–object relation intact:

Base form	Gloss	Translation	With къ(ы)~	Translation
Усхуэдэщ	[2SG.ABS-1SG.IO-like]	"you are like me"	Укъысхуэдэщ	"you are like me" (directional)
Сыпхуэдэщ	[1SG.ABS-2SG.IO-like]	"I am like you"	Сыкъыпхуэдэщ	"I am like you" (directional)
УздокӀуэ	[2SG.ABS-1SG.IO-COM-go]	"you go with me"	УкъыздокӀуэ	"you come with me"
СыпдокӀуэ	[1SG.ABS-2SG.IO-COM-go]	"I go with you"	СыкъыпдокӀуэ	"I come with you"

In short, къ(ы)~ always points to the top of the 1 > 2 > 3 scale: it reads as a plain directional whenever the two participants are both speech-act participants, but as a perspective-flipping inverse as soon as a 3rd person enters the picture.

=== The translocative н- ===
Because Kabardian has the productive translocative н~, the "downward" (away-from-centre) direction can be marked overtly instead of merely left unmarked. This yields a clean three-way contrast on the same verb:

- ЛӀыр хасэм ныхохьэ "the man joins the council [there / away from the speaker]" (translocative)
- ЛӀыр хасэм къыхохьэ "the man joins the council [here / where the speaker is]" (venitive)

It can likewise add outward emphasis to speech: нывжызоӀэ "I am telling it out to y'all" beside plain вжызоӀэ "I am telling it to y'all."

=== The hierarchy across the verb classes ===
The ranking can be read straight off the conjugation paradigms. Kabardian is especially revealing because it marks both poles overtly: the cislocative къ- ("toward the centre") and the translocative н- ("away from it").

==== Monovalent intransitive: no object to rank ====
With one absolutive argument there is nothing to outrank, so the venitive keeps only its "toward here" sense and is optional for every person: Соплъэ / Уоплъэ / Маплъэ "I / you / he look(s)", each optionally taking къы- (Соплъэ → Сыкъоплъэ "I look this way").

==== Bivalent intransitive: the clearest case ====
The subject is absolutive, the object oblique, and the directional tracks the hierarchy exactly (еплъын "to look at", present).

Subject → Object	Direct / inverse	Form
1 → 3 "I look at him"	direct	Соплъ
2 → 3 "you look at him"	direct	Уоплъ
3 → 3 "he looks at him"	direct (tie)	Йоплъ
1 → 2 "I look at you"	direct (1 > 2)	Сыноплъ (translocative)
2 → 1 "you look at me"	inverse	Укъызоплъ
3 → 1 "he looks at me"	inverse	Къызоплъ
3 → 2 "he looks at you"	inverse	Къоплъ

The three inverse cells obligatorily take the cislocative къ-. The decisive cell is Сыноплъ "I look at you": 1→2 is a direct combination, yet Kabardian still marks it with the translocative н- ("away"), the exact mirror of Укъызоплъ "you look at me" (2→1, cislocative къ- "toward"). The two directions are spelled out as opposites, direct proof that 1 outranks 2: from the speaker, the addressee lies away from the centre.

==== Bivalent transitive: no inverse gap ====
A transitive object is absolutive not oblique, and here there is no inverse gap: even the would-be inverse cells keep a plain base form (лъагъун "to see", present).

Subject → Object	Form
1 → 3 "I see him"	Солъагъу
2 → 3 "you see him"	Уолъагъу
1 → 2 "I see you"	Узолъагъу
2 → 1 "you see me"	Сыболъагъу
3 → 1 "he sees me"	Селъагъу
3 → 2 "he sees you"	Уелъагъу
3 → 3 "he sees him"	Елъагъу

The venitive stays an optional extra in every cell. The hierarchy effect is thus tied to the oblique object slot.

==== Trivalent ditransitive: the indirect object ====
The oblique indirect object (recipient) behaves like the bivalent-intransitive object (етын "to give", present, with the direct object "it" = 3SG):

Subject → Recipient	Direct / inverse	Form
1 → 3 "I give it to him"	direct	Изот
2 → 3 "you give it to him"	direct	Ибот
3 → 3 "he gives it to him"	direct (tie)	Ирет
1 → 2 "I give it to you"	direct (1 > 2)	Узот
2 → 1 "you give it to me"	inverse	Къызыбот
3 → 1 "he gives it to me"	inverse	Къызет
3 → 2 "he gives it to you"	inverse	Къыует

The inverse cells carry the cislocative къ-; the direct cells, including 1→2 Узот "I give it to you", are bare. (The outward-marking translocative н- surfaces in the bivalent intransitive, as above. In the ditransitive a local recipient is simply left unmarked.)

In summary, where the object is oblique (look at, give), the cislocative къ- is forced in every inverse combination. Where it is absolutive (see), no gap exists. The translocative н- makes the outward 1→2 direction explicit with Kabardian's signature way of spelling out 1 > 2 > 3.

== Morphology ==
Morphology is a central component of Circassian grammar, since a single Circassian word, particularly a verb, can function as a complete sentence due to its polypersonal nature. Through a rich system of prefixes and suffixes a verb can express the person, number, and role of the subject, direct object, and indirect object, as well as tense, mood, negation, location, and direction.

=== Prefixes ===
Kabardian utilizes a variety of prefixes to alter the meaning or valency of a verb. Most verbal prefixes either express direction (on, under, etc.) or increase the valency (adding participants like beneficiaries or co-actors).

==== Negative form ====
Negation in Kabardian is expressed through two primary morphemes, depending on the context and tense.

1. Prefix ~мы~ Used primarily in the imperative mood (commands) and with participles.

Base Verb	Meaning	Negative Form	Meaning
кӀуэ	go!	умыкӀуэ	don't go!
шхэ	eat!	умышхэ	don't eat!
фыжей	sleep! (pl)	фымыжей	don't sleep! (pl)

2. Suffix ~къым Used primarily in indicative tenses (past, present, future). It usually attaches to the very end of the verb complex.

Base Verb	Meaning	Negative Form	Meaning
кӀуащ	(s)he went	кӀуакъым	(s)he didn't go
мэшхэ	(s)he is eating	шхэркъым	(s)he is not eating
еджэнущ	(s)he will read	еджэнукъым	(s)he will not read

==== Causative ====
The prefix гъэ~ (/ʁa/) indicates causation (making or letting someone do something). It increases the valency of the verb by adding a causer.

Base Word	Meaning	Causative Form	Meaning
хуабэ	hot	егъэхуабэ	(s)he heats it
щӀыӀэ	cold	егъэщӀыӀэ	(s)he chills it
мэкӀуэ	(s)he goes	егъакӀуэ	(s)he sends him/her
еджэ	(s)he reads	регъаджэ	(s)he teaches him/her

Examples:

- ЩӀалэм и шы тучаным егъакӀуэ. — "The boy sends his brother to the shop."
- Пщащэм и тхылъ сэ сыригъэджащ. — "The girl allowed me to read her book."

==== Comitative ====
The prefix дэ~ (/da/) indicates an action performed together with someone ("with").

Base Verb	Meaning	Comitative Form	Meaning
мэкӀуэ	(s)he goes	докӀуэ	(s)he goes with him/her
еплъ	(s)he looks at	деплъ	(s)he looks at it with him/her
щӀэс	(s)he sits in	дэщӀэс	(s)he sits in it with him/her

Examples:

- ЩӀалэр пщащэм догущыӀэ. — "The boy is talking with the girl."
- Сабийхэр зэдэджэгухэщ. — "The kids are playing together."
- Сэрэ си шырэ тучаным дызэдокӀуэ. — "Me and my brother are going to the shop together."

==== Benefactive ====
The prefix хуэ~ (/xʷa/) indicates an action performed for someone's benefit ("for"). (Where Adyghe uses фэ~, the East Circassian cognate is хуэ~.)

Base Verb	Meaning	Benefactive Form	Meaning
мэкӀуэ	(s)he goes	хуокӀуэ	(s)he goes for him/her
еплъ	(s)he looks at	хуеплъ	(s)he looks at it for him/her
щӀэс	(s)he sits in	хуэщӀэс	(s)he sits in it for him/her

Examples:

- ЩӀалэр пщащэм хуокӀуэ тучаным. — "The boy is going to the shop for the girl."
- ЩӀалэм псы лӀым хуехь. — "The boy is bringing water for the man."
- Къысхуэщэху зыгуэр сефэну. — "Buy something for me to drink."

==== Malefactive ====
The prefix фӀэ~ (/fʼa/) indicates an action performed against someone's interest or will. It strongly implies taking something away from someone. (It corresponds to Adyghe шӀу~.)

Base Verb	Meaning	Malefactive Form	Meaning
ехь	(s)he carries it	фӀехь	(s)he takes it from him
едыгъу	(s)he steals it	фӀедыгъу	(s)he steals it from him
ещтэ	(s)he takes it	фӀещтэ	(s)he takes it away from him
ешх	(s)he eats	фӀешх	(s)he eats his food (loss)

Examples:

- Си щӀыгур къысфӀахьащ. — "They took my land away from me."
- Си анэм си машинэ къысфӀихащ. — "My mother took my car (against my interest/will)."
- ЩӀалэм пщащэм и шхын фӀешх. — "The boy is eating the girl's food (depriving her of it)."

=== Suffixes ===
Kabardian uses suffixes to express aspect, capability, manner, and other nuances.

==== Frequentative / Reversive ====
The verbal suffix ~ж (/ʐ/) indicates the repetition of an action ("again") or the return to a previous state/location ("back"). It can also denote the completion of an action. (It is the cognate of Adyghe ~жь.)

Base Verb	Meaning	Frequentative Form	Meaning
ехь	(s)he carries it	ехьыж	(s)he takes it back/again
ещтэ	(s)he takes it	ещтэж	(s)he takes it back
ешх	(s)he eats	ешхыж	(s)he eats again

Examples:

- ЛӀым и Ӏуэху ещӀэж. — "The man is doing his job again."
- Хым сыкӀуэжыну сыхуейщ. — "I want to return to the sea."
- Экзаменым сыхуеджэжащ. — "I finished studying for the exam."

==== Duration / Converb ====
The verbal suffix ~у (/w/) creates a converb, designating an action that takes place simultaneously with another action ("while"). The durative variant ~урэ stresses an ongoing "while doing".

Base Verb	Meaning	Duration Form	Meaning
мэкӀуэ	(s)he goes	кӀуэу	while going
ещтэ	(s)he takes it	ещтэу	while taking it
ешх	(s)he eats	ешхыу	while eating

Examples:

- СыкӀуэу щӀалэр слъагъуащ. — "While I was going, I saw the boy."
- Си анэр ди унэр итхьэщӀыу, унэм сыкъихьэжащ. — "I came home while my mother was washing the house."
- Шхын щымыӀэу дыкъэнащ. — "We are left with no food."

==== Capability ====
The verbal suffix ~ф (/f/) designates the ability or potential to perform the indicated action ("can", "able to"). (It corresponds to Adyghe ~шъу.)

Base Verb	Meaning	Capability Form	Meaning
ехь	(s)he carries it	ехьыф	(s)he can carry it
ещтэ	(s)he takes it	ещтэф	(s)he can take it
ешх	(s)he eats	ешхыф	(s)he can eat

Examples:

- ЛӀыжьыр мажэф. — "The old man is capable of running."
- Экзаменым сыхуеджэф. — "I can study for the exam."
- Фильмым сеплъыфакъым. — "I could not watch the movie."

==== Manner ====
The verbal suffix ~кӀэ (/t͡ʃʼa/) expresses the manner in which the action is performed. It effectively turns the verb into a noun meaning "way of [verb]ing".

Base Verb	Meaning	Manner Noun	Meaning
мэкӀуэ	(s)he goes	кӀуэкӀэ	gait / way of walking
жеӀэ	(s)he says it	жыӀэкӀэ	way of saying
еджэ	(s)he reads/studies	еджэкӀэ	way of studying

Examples:

- Пщащэм и кӀуэкӀэ дахэщ. — "The girl's way of walking is beautiful."
- ЩӀалэм и еджэкӀэ дэгъуэкъым. — "The boy's way of studying is not good."
- Унэм и щӀыкӀэ тэрэзкъым. — "The house is not structured right."

Alternatively, manner can be expressed using the prefix зэры~ (/zarə/) combined with a case marker on the verb, though this functions syntactically as a relative clause ("how (s)he does it").

- Пщащэр зэрыкӀуэр дахэщ. — "The way the girl goes is beautiful."

== Positional conjugation ==
In Kabardian, positional prefixes express being in different positions and places and can also express the spatial direction of a verb. The positional conjugation of some dynamic verbs below shows how the prefix changes the indicated direction of the verb.

Position	Prefix	Example	
Position	Prefix	Looking (еплъын)	Throwing (едзын)
Body position/Pose	щы~ [ɕə]	щоплъ [ɕopɬ] "(s)he is looking at that place"	щедз [ɕajd͡z] "(s)he is throwing at that place"
On	те~ [taj]	топлъ [topɬ] "(s)he is looking on"	тедз [tajd͡z] "(s)he is throwing on/at"
Under	щӀэ~ [ɕʼa]	щӀоплъ [ɕʼopɬ] "(s)he is looking under"	щӀедз [ɕʼajd͡z] "(s)he is throwing under"
Through/Within some mass	хэ~ [xa]	хоплъ [xopɬ] "(s)he is looking through"	хедз [xajd͡z] "(s)he is throwing through"
Within some area	дэ~ [da]	доплъ [dopɬ] "(s)he is looking at some area"	дедз [dajd͡z] "(s)he is throwing at some area"
Inside an object	дэ~ [da]	доплъ [dopɬ] "(s)he is looking inside an object"	дедз [dajd͡z] "(s)he is throwing inside an object"
Around	Ӏу~ [ʔʷə]	Ӏуоплъ [ʔʷopɬ] "(s)he is looking around"	Ӏуедз [ʔʷajd͡z] "(s)he is throwing around"
Inside	и~ [jə~]	йоплъ [jopɬ] "(s)he is looking inside"	редз [rajd͡z] "(s)he is throwing inside"
Hanged/Attached	пы [pə]	поплъ [popɬ] "(s)he is searching by looking"	педз [pajd͡z] "(s)he is hanging by throwing"
Behind	къуэ [qʷa]	къуоплъ [qʷopɬ] "(s)he is looking behind"	къуедз [qʷajd͡z] "(s)he is throwing behind"
Aside	гуэ [ɡʷa]	гуоплъ [ɡʷopɬ] "(s)he is looking aside"	гуедз [ɡʷajd͡z] "(s)he is throwing aside"
In front of	пэӀу [paʔʷə]	пэӀуоплъ [paʔʷopɬ] "(s)he is looking in front of"	пэӀуедз [paʔʷajd͡z] "(s)he is throwing in front of"
Backwards	зэщӀэ [zat͡ʃʼa]	зэщӀоплъ [zat͡ʃʼopɬ] "(s)he is looking backwards"	зэщӀедз [zat͡ʃʼajd͡z] "(s)he is throwing backwards"
Inside within	кӀуэцӀ [kʷʼat͡sʼ]	кӀуэцӀоплъ [kʷʼat͡sʼopɬ] "(s)he is looking within inside"	кӀуэцӀедз [kʷʼat͡sʼajd͡z] "(s)he is throwing within inside"
Near	кӀэлъыры [t͡ʃʼaɬərə]	кӀэлъыроплъ [t͡ʃʼaɬəropɬ] "(s)he is looking near"	кӀэлъыредз [t͡ʃʼaɬərajd͡z] "(s)he is throwing near"
Toward	лъы [ɬə]	лъоплъ [ɬopɬ] "(s)he is looking toward"	лъедз [ɬajd͡z] "(s)he is throwing toward"
Past	блэ [bla]	блоплъ [blopɬ] "(s)he is looking past"	бледз [blajd͡z] "(s)he is throwing past"
Toward the head	щхьэры [ɕħarə]	щхьэроплъ [ɕħaropɬ] "(s)he is looking at the head"	щхьэредз [ɕħarajd͡z] "(s)he is throwing at the head"
Over	щхьэдэ [ɕħada]	щхьэдоплъ [ɕħadopɬ] "(s)he is looking pass over"	щхьэдедз [ɕħadajd͡z] "(s)he is throwing pass over"
Over and beyond	щхьэпры [ɕħaprə]	щхьэпроплъ [ɕħapropɬ] "(s)he is looking beyond"	щхьэпредз [ɕħaprajd͡z] "(s)he is throwing beyond"
Directly at	жэхэ [ʒaxa]	жэхоплъ [ʒaxopɬ] "(s)he is glaring at one's face"	жэхедз [ʒaxajd͡z] "(s)he is throwing at one's face"
Directed toward a mouth	жэдэ~ [ʒada~]	жэдоплъ [ʒadopɬ] "(s)he is looking at a mouth"	жэдедз [ʒadajd͡z] "(s)he is throwing at a mouth"

щӀалэм шхынхэр Ӏэнэм трелъхьэ
щӀалэ-м шхын-хэ-р Ӏэнэ-м т-р-е-лъхьэ
ɕʼaːlam ʃxənxar ʔanam trajɬħa
boy-ERG food-PL-ABS table-OBL on-3SG.ABS-3SG.ERG-put.PRS
"The boy is putting the foods on the table."

мы псалъэм къэлэмкӀэ гуэтх
мы псалъэ-м къэлэм-кӀэ гуэ-тх
mə psaːɬam qalamt͡ʃʼa gʷatx
DEF word-OBL pencil-INS write besides
"Write besides this word with a pencil"

=== Transitivity and positional ===
Adding a positional prefix to a verb often alters its valency by introducing a new spatial or locative argument. This new argument is always placed in the oblique case (marked by -м). The behavior of the verb and its arguments changes depending on its original transitivity.

==== Monovalent intransitive verbs ====
When a positional prefix is attached to a monovalent intransitive verb, it adds a new valency. Because they don't have an oblique case argument by default, the new argument serves as the locative target, effectively turning it into a bivalent intransitive verb. Notice how the default dynamic 3rd-person prefix (мэ-/ма-) drops when the positional prefix is introduced.

Sentence	Word Breakdown	Gloss	Function	Translation
Ар маплъэ.	ар ма-плъэ	He 3SG.ABS-look	S VERB	"He is looking."
Ар абы топлъ.	ар абы ø-т-о-плъ	He that 3SG.ABS-on-look	S IO VERB	"He is looking on/at that."
ЩӀалэр мэпсалъэ.	щӀалэ-р мэ-псалъэ	boy-ABS 3SG.ABS-speak	S VERB	"The boy is speaking."
ЩӀалэр пщащэм топсэлъыхь.	щӀалэ-р пщащэ-м ø-т-о-псэлъыхь	boy-ABS girl-OBL 3SG.ABS-on-speak	S IO VERB	"The boy is speaking about the girl."
ЩӀалэр матхэ.	щӀалэ-р ма-тхэ	boy-ABS 3SG.ABS-write	S VERB	"The boy is writing."
ЩӀалэр Ӏэнэм тетхэ.	щӀалэ-р Ӏэнэ-м ø-те-тхэ	boy-ABS table-OBL 3SG.ABS-on-write	S IO VERB	"The boy is writing on the table."
Сэ уэ сыптопсэлъыхь.	сэ уэ сы-п-т-о-псэлъыхь	I you 1SG.ABS-2SG.OBL-on-speak	S IO VERB	"I talk about you."
Уэ сэ укъыстопсэлъыхь.	уэ сэ у-къы-с-т-о-псэлъыхь	You me 2SG.ABS-DIR-1SG.OBL-on-speak	S IO VERB	"You talk about me."
Уэ уаплъэ.	уэ у-а-плъэ	You 2SG.ABS-look	S VERB	"You look."
Уэ сэ укъызоплъ.	уэ сэ у-къы-з-о-плъ	You me 2SG.ABS-DIR-1SG.OBL-DAT-look	S IO VERB	"You look at me."
Уэ сэ укъыстоплъ.	уэ сэ у-къы-с-т-о-плъ	You me 2SG.ABS-DIR-1SG.OBL-on-look	S IO VERB	"You look on/at me."
Сэ уэ сыптоплъ.	сэ уэ сы-п-т-о-плъ	I you 1SG.ABS-2SG.OBL-on-look	S IO VERB	"I look on/at you."

==== Bivalent intransitive verbs ====
Bivalent intransitive verbs cannot simply take a new positional preposition because they already have an argument in the oblique case behaving as a dative/target. Instead, the positional prefix replaces the standard directional prefix, shifting the existing oblique noun/pronoun from a general dative target to a specific locative one.

Sentence	Word Breakdown	Gloss	Function	Translation
ЩӀалэр пшынэм йоуэ.	щӀалэ-р пшынэ-м ø-й-о-уэ	boy-ABS accordion-OBL 3SG.ABS-DAT-hit	S IO VERB	"The boy hits the accordion."
ЩӀалэр пшынэм тоуэ.	щӀалэ-р пшынэ-м ø-т-о-уэ	boy-ABS accordion-OBL 3SG.ABS-on-hit	S IO VERB	"The boy hits on the accordion."
Сэ соуэ.	сэ с-о-уэ	I 1SG.ABS-DAT-hit	S VERB	"I hit."
Сэ уэ сыноуэ.	сэ уэ сы-н-о-уэ	I you 1SG.ABS-2SG.OBL-hit	S IO VERB	"I hit you."
Сэ уэ сыптоуэ.	сэ уэ сы-п-т-о-уэ	I you 1SG.ABS-2SG.OBL-on-hit	S IO VERB	"I hit on you."

==== Bivalent transitive verbs ====
Standard bivalent transitive verbs have an ergative subject and an absolutive direct object but no oblique role. The addition of a positional prefix introduces a new locative argument in the oblique case, turning the verb into a trivalent transitive verb. The positional prefix stacks with the ergative marker.

Sentence	Word Breakdown	Gloss	Function	Translation
ЩӀалэм мывэр едз.	щӀалэ-м мывэ-р ø-е-дз	boy-ERG stone-ABS 3SG.ABS-3SG.ERG-throw	A O VERB	"The boy throws the stone."
ЩӀалэм мывэр хым хедз.	щӀалэ-м мывэ-р хы-м ø-х-е-дз	boy-ERG stone-ABS sea-OBL 3SG.ABS-in-3SG.ERG-throw	A O IO VERB	"The boy throws the stone into the sea."
ЩӀалэм псалъэр етх.	щӀалэ-м псалъэ-р ø-е-тх	boy-ERG word-ABS 3SG.ABS-3SG.ERG-write	A O VERB	"The boy writes the word."
ЩӀалэм псалъэр Ӏэнэм третх.	щӀалэ-м псалъэ-р Ӏэнэ-м ø-т-р-е-тх	boy-ERG word-ABS table-OBL 3SG.ABS-on-3SG.ERG-write	A O IO VERB	"The boy writes the word on the table."
ЩӀалэм пщащэр елъагъу.	щӀалэ-м пщащэ-р ø-е-лъагъу	boy-ERG girl-ABS 3SG.ABS-3SG.ERG-see	A O VERB	"The boy sees the girl."
ЩӀалэм пщащэр жыгым щӀелъагъу.	щӀалэ-м пщащэ-р жыгы-м ø-щӀ-е-лъагъу	boy-ERG girl-ABS tree-OBL 3SG.ABS-under-3SG.ERG-see	A O IO VERB	"The boy sees the girl under the tree."
Сэ уэ узолъагъу.	сэ уэ у-з-о-лъагъу	I you 2SG.ABS-1SG.ERG-PRS-see	A O VERB	"I see you."
Сэ уэ унащхьэм утызолъагъу.	сэ уэ унэ-щхьэ-м у-т-ы-з-о-лъагъу	I you house-head-OBL 2SG.ABS-on-DIR-1SG.ERG-PRS-see	A O IO VERB	"I see you on the roof."
Уэ сэ унащхьэм сыптолъагъу.	уэ сэ унэ-щхьэ-м сы-п-т-о-лъагъу	You me house-head-OBL 1SG.ABS-2SG.ERG-on-see	A O IO VERB	"You see me on the roof."

==== Trivalent transitive verbs ====
Trivalent transitive verbs (also called ditransitive verbs) cannot take a positional prefix. This is because these verbs inherently require three arguments (agent, theme, and recipient/goal), meaning their oblique case slot is already occupied. Adding a locative positional prefix would conflict with the existing indirect object argument structure.

=== Positional verbs ===
In Kabardian, certain verb roots denote a general sense of motion such as entering, exiting, removing, or falling, but cannot exist on their own. They inherently require a positional prefix to specify the spatial nature of the action.

The matrix below shows how these bound motion roots combine with common positional prefixes: те- (on), щӀэ- (under), и- (inside), and хэ- (within a mass/liquid).

Note: For the transitive roots (-хын and -хун) the 3rd-person singular ergative marker -е- stacks and merges with the positional prefix (e.g., щӀэ + е + хы + н = щӀехын).

Root	Action	те- (On)	щӀэ- (Under)	и- (Inside)	хэ- (Within Mass)
-хьэн	to enter / step into	техьэн "to step on"	щӀэхьэн "to step under"	ихьэн "to enter (inside)"	хэхьэн "to enter (water/crowd)"
-кӀын	to exit / go off	текӀын "to get off"	щӀэкӀын "to exit from under"	икӀын "to exit (inside)"	хэкӀын "to exit (water/crowd)"
-хын (transitive)	to take off / remove	техын "to take off (from top)"	щӀехын "to take out from under"	ихын "to take out from inside"	хехын "to take out of (a mass)"
-хун (transitive)	to drive off / chase	техун "to drive off (the top)"	щӀехун "to drive from under"	ихун "to drive out of (inside)"	хехун "to drive out of (a mass)"
-дзын (transitive)	to drop / throw	тедзын "to drop onto (the top)"	щӀэдзын "to throw under"	идзын "to drop inside"	хэдзын "to throw into (a mass)"
-лъэдэн	to run into	телъэдэн "to run onto"	щӀэлъэдэн "to run under"	илъэдэн "to run into (inside)"	хэлъэдэн "to run into (a mass)"
-жэн	to run	тежэн "to run on (the top)"	щӀэжэн "to run under"	ижэн "to run inside"	хэжэн "to run in (a mass)"
-хуэн	to fall	техуэн "to fall on"	щӀэхуэн "to fall under"	ихуэн "to fall inside"	хэхуэн "to fall into (a mass)"

=== Positional conjugation of static verbs ===
The matrix below shows the positional conjugation of some steady-state verbs, including how the root changes the indicated position.

	prefix	stands	sits	lies
Body position/Pose	щы~ [ɕə]	щыт [ɕət]	щыс [ɕəs]	щылъ [ɕəɬ]
On	те~ [taj]	тет [tat]	тес [tas]	телъ [taɬ]
Under	щӀэ~ [ɕʼa]	щӀэт [ɕʼat]	щӀэс [ɕʼas]	щӀэлъ [ɕʼaɬ]
Among	хэ~ [xa]	хэт [xat]	хэс [xas]	хэлъ [xaɬ]
Within some mass	хэ~ [xa]	хэт [xat]	хэс [xas]	хэлъ [xaɬ]
Within some area	дэ~ [da]	дэт [dat]	дэс [das]	дэлъ [daɬ]
Inside an object	дэ~ [da]	дэт [dat]	дэс [das]	дэлъ [daɬ]
Around	Ӏу~ [ʔʷə]	Ӏут [ʔʷət]	Ӏyc [ʔʷəs]	Ӏулъ [ʔʷəɬ]
Inside	и~ [jə]	ит [jət]	иc [jəs]	илъ [jəɬ]
Hanged	пы~ [pə]	пыт [pət]	пыc [pəs]	пылъ [pəɬ]
Attached	пы~ [pə]	пыт [pət]	пыc [pəs]	пылъ [pəɬ]
Behind	къуэ~ [qʷa]	къуэт [qʷat]	къуэc [qʷas]	къуэлъ [qʷaɬ]
Aside	гуэ~ [ɡʷa]	гуэт [ɡʷat]	гуэc [ɡʷas]	гуэлъ [ɡʷaɬ]
Inside within	кӀуэцӀ~ [kʷʼat͡sʼ]	кӀуэцӀыт [kʷʼat͡sʼət]	кӀуэцӀыc [kʷʼat͡sʼəs]	кӀуэцӀылъ [kʷʼat͡sʼəɬ]

шхыныр Ӏэнэм телъщ
шхын-ыр Ӏэнэ-м те-лъ-щ
ʃxənər ʔanam tajɬɕ
food-ABS table-OBL on-lay.PRS
"The food is on the table"

щӀалэхэр тучаным Ӏутщ
щӀалэ-хэ-р тучан-ым Ӏу-т-щ
ɕʼaːlaxar tut͡ʃaːnəm ʔʷətɕ
boy-PL-ABS shop-OBL around-stand.PRS
"The boys are standing near the shop."
