= Applicative voice =

Grammatical voice

The applicative voice (/əˈplɪkətɪv/; abbreviated APL or APPL) is a grammatical voice that promotes an oblique argument of a verb to the core object argument. It is generally considered a valency-increasing morpheme. The applicative is often found in agglutinative languages, such as the Bantu languages and Austronesian languages. Other examples include Nuxalk, Ubykh, and Ainu.

== Behavior ==
Prototypically, applicatives apply to intransitive verbs. They can also be called "advancements" or "object promotion" because they bring a peripheral object to the centre as a direct object. This object is sometimes called the applied object. For transitive verbs, the resulting verb can be ditransitive, or the original object is no longer expressed. If the original object is no longer expressed, it is not a valency-increasing operation

== Multiple applicatives ==
A language may have multiple applicatives, each corresponding to different roles. These roles include instrumental, comitative, benefactive, locative, and (although rarely) genitive. Sometimes various applicatives will be expressed by the same morphological exponence, such as in the Bantu language Chewa, where the suffix -ir- forms both instrumental and locative applicatives. Some languages, such as Luganda, permit a 'second applicative' (known in Luganda as the "augmentative applied"), formed by a double application of the suffix. In this case, the second applicative is used to give an alternative meaning.

Applicatives may also be the only way of expressing such roles, as in the Bantu Chaga languages, where instrumental, benefactive, malefactive, and locative are formed solely by applicatives. In other languages, applicatives coexist with other methods of expressing said roles. They are often used to bring a normally oblique argument into special focus, or as in Nez Percé, to keep humans as core arguments.

== Similar processes ==
Applicatives have a degree of overlap with causatives, and in some languages, the two are realized identically. A similar construction known as dative shift, though different from true applicatives, occurs in other languages. Also, the benefactive case is commonly expressed by means of an applicative.

== Examples ==
=== Ainu ===
In the Ainu language, valency of verbs can be modulated through multiple mechanisms. The language employs three applicative prefixes: DAT ko-, INS e-, and LOC o-, each of which serves to increase the valency of a verb. For instance, an intransitive verb with only one argument slot can be modified by an applicative prefix to become a transitive verb, thus requiring two argument slots to be syntactically well-formed.

Consider the following example, where the intransitive verb itak (“to speak”) initially has one argument slot that is fulfilled by the subject pronoun prefix ku= (“I”).

ku=itak.
1SG.NOM=speak.VI
I am speaking.

By applying the dative applicative prefix ko- (“to”), the verb transforms into koytak (“to speak with”), a transitive verb. Now, it requires both a subject, indicated by the prefix ku=, and an object, which takes a zero morpheme to denote the third person, referring to the noun hekaci:

hekaci ku=∅=ko-itak.
boy 1SG.NOM=3SG.ACC=APL.DAT-speak.VI
I am speaking with a boy.

=== English ===
English does not have a dedicated applicative prefix or suffix. However, prepositions can be compounded with verbs for an applicative effect. For example, from

- Jack ran faster than the giant,

the intransitive verb ran can be made transitive, and the oblique noun giant the object:

- Jack outran the giant.

The applicative verb can be made passive, something which is not possible with ran:

- The giant was outrun by Jack.

=== German ===
The German prefix be- is considered an applicative by some, but other analyses reject this view.

=== Swahili ===
Swahili has an applicative suffix -i or -e which appears before the last vowel of the verb. From andika 'to write', we get transitive

a-li-andik-a barua
he-PST-write-IND letter
'he wrote a letter'

and ditransitive

a-li-ni-andik-i-a barua
he-PST-me-write-APL-IND letter
'he wrote me a letter', or 'he wrote a letter for me'

Similarly, from soma 'to read',

- Alinisomea barua 'he read me a letter', 'he read a letter to me'.

These are sometimes called 'prepositional' forms of the verb because they are translated into English using prepositions: cry for, pray for, eat with, enjoy (be happy about), arrive at, sing to, sell to, send to, open (the door) for, reckon with, see for (himself), die at. However, this name is inaccurate for Swahili, which doesn't use prepositions for such purposes.

=== Swedish ===
The Swedish prefix be- has been analyzed as an applicative by Claire Gronemeyer.

=== Yagua ===
Yagua is one language that has dedicated morphology for applicative uses. Here, the applicative suffix -ta shows that the locative or instrumental oblique is now a direct object:

sa-duu rá-viimú
3SG-blow INAN-into
"He blows into it." (valence = 1)

sa-duu-tá-ra
3SG-blow-APPL-INAN:OBJ
"He blows it." (valence = 2)

This same -ta suffix can be used with transitive verbs to create ditransitives:

sį-įchití-rya javanu quiichi-tya
3SG-poke-INAN:OBJ meat knife-INSTR
"He poked the meat with the knife." (valence = 2)

sį-įchití-tya-ra quiichiy
3SG-poke-APPL-INAN:OBJ knife
"He poked something with the knife." (valence = 3)

These behave identically as other lexical ditransitives, such as give and send in this language.
