= Lexical rule =

Theoretical rules of syntax

A lexical rule is a form of syntactic rule used within many theories of natural language syntax. These rules alter the argument structures of lexical items (for example verbs and declensions) in order to alter their combinatory properties.

Lexical rules affect in particular specific word classes and morphemes. Moreover, they may have exceptions, do not apply across word boundaries and can only apply to underlying forms.

An example of a lexical rule in spoken English is the change of vowel in "keep" vs. "kept".

Lexical rules are the inverse of postlexical rules.
