= Dative shift =

Shifting sentence forms with two-object verbs

In linguistics, dative shift refers to a pattern in which the subcategorization of a verb can take on two alternating forms, the oblique dative form or the double object construction form. In the oblique dative (OD) form, the verb takes a noun phrase (NP) and a dative prepositional phrase (PP), the second of which is not a core argument.

(1) John gave [_{NP} a book ] [_{PP.DATIVE} to Mary ].

In the double object construction (DOC) form the verb takes two noun phrases, both of which are core arguments, with the dative argument preceding the other argument.

(2) John gave [_{NP.DATIVE} Mary ] [_{NP} a book ].

== Synonyms used in the literature ==
Terms used in literature on dative shift can vary. The chart below provides terms used in this article along with common synonyms used elsewhere.

Pattern:	John gave [_{NP.DATIVE} Mary] [_{NP} a book]	John gave [_{NP} a book] [_{PP.DATIVE} to Mary]	
term used in this article	double object construction (DOC)	oblique dative (OD)	dative alternation
terms used elsewhere	dative shift	simple dative	dative construction
terms used elsewhere	verb phrase complementation structure	dative complement structure	dative transformation

== Distribution of dative shift in English ==
Traditional grammar suggests (as a "rule of thumb") that only single-syllable verbs can be in the double object construction (DOC).

(3a) John bought [ Mary] [ a cake ]
(3b) John bought [ a cake ] [ for Mary ]

(4a) *John acquired [ Mary ] [ a new car ]
(4b) John acquired [ a new car ] [ for Mary ]

One explanation for this lies with the origin of the verbs that allow the double object construction. Generally, native (Anglo-Saxon) verbs allow the DOC form, whereas Latinate verbs do not. This is thought to be primarily due to the stress associated with native verbs, rather than etymological conditions, as native verbs often have a single metrical foot as opposed to multiple metrical feet common of Latinate verbs. Therefore, a morphological constraint on the distribution of verbs participating in dative alternation is influenced by phonological properties. Pinker (1989) supports this observation with examples of Latinate verbs with one metrical foot (e.g. promise, offer, assign, award) that allow the DOC.

An additional semantic component constrains some native verbs further. These verbs must have the theta-role of thematic relation recipient/goal/beneficiary in their theta grid when in DOC form. A theta grid is where theta roles are stored for a particular verb (see Section 2 on the theta role page). In example (5), the DOC form is not permitted, despite the verb root being single syllable, because [wash] lacks the theta-role of recipient. One explanation for why the verb lacks this theta-role is that there is no possessive relationship between the direct object and the indirect object).

(5a) *[John] washed [Mary] [the dishes]
(5b) [John] washed [the dishes][for Mary]

The double object construction requires a possessor/possessed relationship. This means the indirect object in the oblique dative construction must have the theta-role of beneficiary (PP introduced by [for]) or recipient/goal (PP introduced by [to]) to be a candidate for the dative alternation. This theory suggests verbs chosen for the double object construction are done so before syntactic processes take place. The knowledge of the relationship of possession/possessed (the semantic constraint) is learned prior to the class constraint of the verbs (native vs. Latinate). The table below demonstrates verbs that do and do not allow the DOC form, verbs have been underlined for clarity.

Examples of verb that allow the DOC form	Examples of verbs that do not allow the DOC form
Tell me your idea	*Expose them your answer
Toss me the ball	*Recount me a story
Make me a sandwich	*Donate her the money
Send me a letter	?Purchase her a birthday cake
Mail me a letter	*Explain me the solution

== Analyses of dative shift ==
=== Chomsky 1955 ===
Noam Chomsky, in The Logical Structure of Linguistic Theory (1955, 1975) provides a proposal about dative structure using transformational grammar.

Chomsky's argument suggests that an oblique dative example like [John sent a letter to Mary] derives from an underlying form.

In this oblique dative sentence [John sent a letter to Mary], the verb, [sent], and its indirect object, [to Mary], make up a constituent that excludes the direct object [a letter]. The OD form therefore involves an underlying verb phrase (VP) whose subject is [a letter] and whose object is [(to) Mary]. The VP [sent to Mary] is considered an inner constituent. This inner constituent is clear to see in the D-Structure, but is obscured in the S-Structure after V-Raising.

Examples (6) and (7) show the oblique dative form as it appears in its underlying representation before V-Raising (6) and in its surface representation after V-Raising (7):

(6) John [_{VP} a letter [_{V'} send to Mary]] (D-Structure)
(7) John send [_{VP} a letter [_{V'} to Mary]] (S-Structure)

=== Kayne 1983 ===
In his book, Connectedness and Binary Branching, Richard S. Kayne proposed that an empty preposition is the source of the double-object construction. In his analysis, English prepositions have the ability to assign objective grammatical case. Kayne argues that an empty preposition is responsible for allowing a double object construction.

(8) John bought [ _{pp} P_{e} [Mary]] a book.

Kayne continues with the notion that an empty preposition (P_{e}) cannot be the source of case role. Instead the empty preposition transfers the case assigned by the verb. He further stipulates that case may only be transferred via prepositions that normally assign object case. Therefore, languages that do not assign object case via prepositions (such as French) cannot have the double-object form.

=== Barss and Lasnik 1986 ===
In their 1986 paper "A Note on Anaphora and Double Objects", Barss and Lasnik point out a number of asymmetries in the behaviour of the two NPs in double object construction. All of their findings point to the same conclusion: in constructions involving a verb phrase of the form V-NP1-NP2, the first NP c-commands the second NP, but not vice versa. The paper provides significant evidence for rejecting linear phrase structure trees.

=== Larson 1988 ===
Larson builds off of the original proposal made by Chomsky, stating that the Oblique Dative form is derived from an underlying structure. Larson suggests that both the oblique dative form and the double object construction are surface representations. He relates the oblique dative and double object structures derivationally.

==== Oblique datives ====
To account for oblique datives, Larson adopts a proposal originally made by Chomsky (1955, 1975), where the verb in the deep structure is raised in the surface structure (S-structure) (see Figure 1).

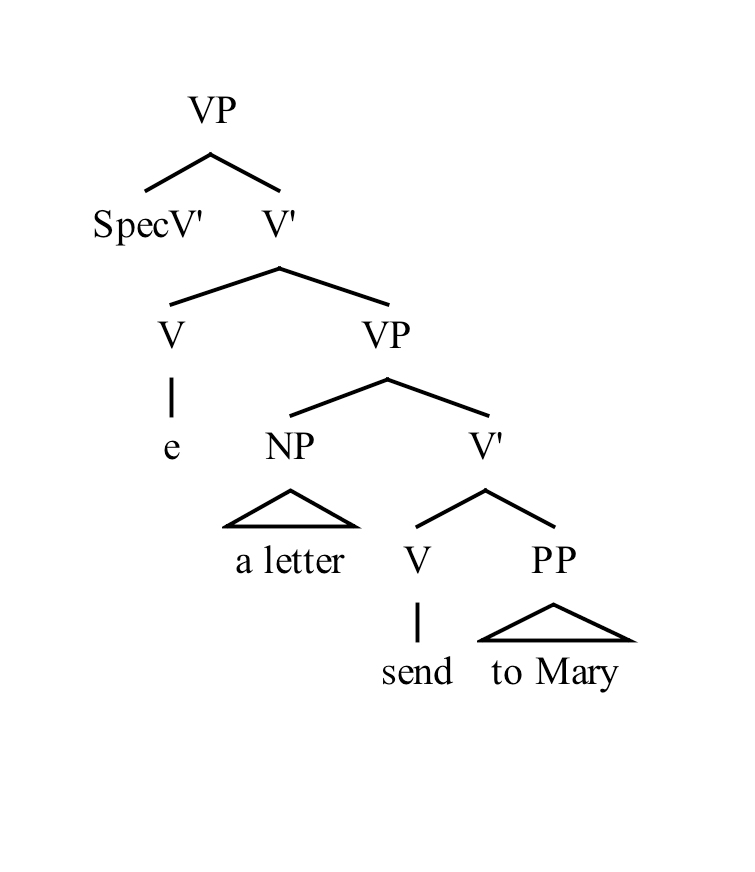
Fig. 1 Underlying structure of an oblique dative construction

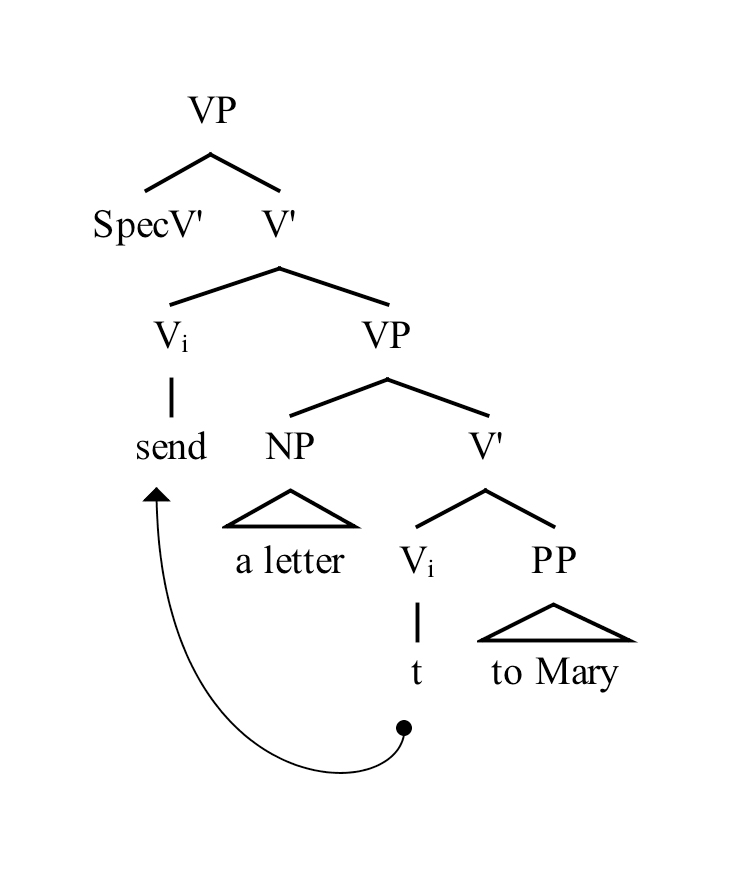
Fig. 2 The V-raising of an oblique dative construction

Deep structure of VP:
Empty V: e
VP complement: a letter send to Mary
The specifier: a letter
Head: send
PP complement: to Mary

The correct ordering of the oblique dative surfaces through head to head movement. See Figure 2. The verb [send], which moves to the empty V position, has two thematic roles that are assigned to the internal arguments theme: [a letter] and goal [to Mary]. The movement leaves a trace at the original V and creates a sequence of co-indexed V positions. Raising is attributed to case and Inflectional Agreement.

Before raising	After raising
V is not the head of a projection governed by inflection	The head of the topmost VP, (V) is governed by inflection
NP is not governed by the verb and cannot receive case	The verb can assign objective case to the NP

Larson's motivations for V' Raising are the same motivations used to derive the surface order of raising in VSO languages, such as Irish. Specifically, the subject NP can receive case from the V, when V governs the NP. Citing Chomsky (1975, 55) in the process, Larson provides an intuitive explanation of oblique datives. He argues that [to send] forms the small predicate [send-to-Mary.] It can be said of this small predicate that it has the inner subject [a letter]. This forms a clause-like VP [a letter send to Mary]

==== Double object construction ====
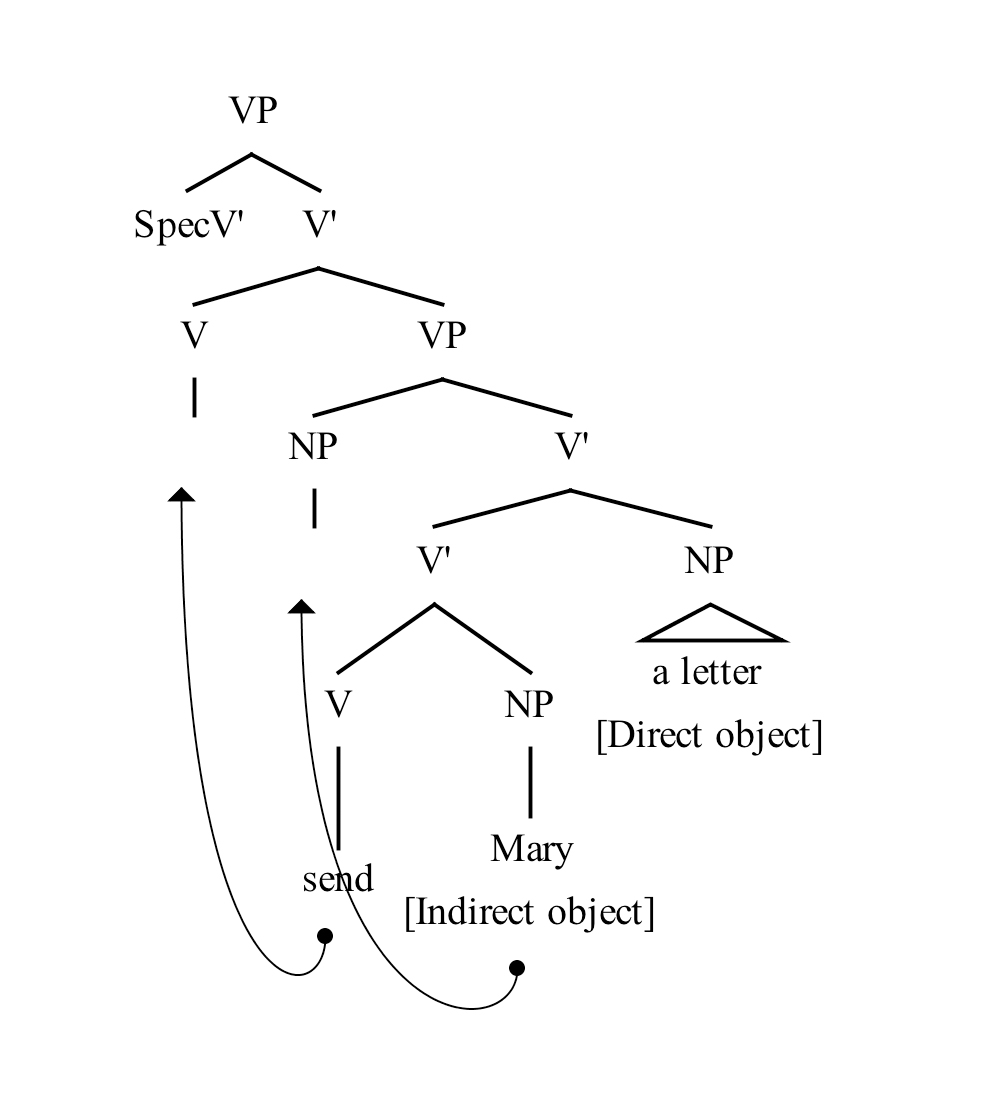
Fig 3: The surface representation of the double object construction using a derivational approach

Larson states that the double object construction can be explained under a derivational approach. He proposes an operation he names “passive derivation” defined as: NP movement that promotes an argument to the subject position of an inflectional phrase or verb phrase.

First, Larson strengthens the argument that the two NPs in Figure 1 above, relate to subject and object position. He states that the governed preposition to has the status of dative case case marking. This is similar to case marking appearing on indirect object in more highly inflected languages. Secondly, Larson extends operations that apply between subjects and objects to structures such as those shown in Figure 1. Specifically, he looks the two main effects of passive derivation occurring in the inner VP:

- Withdrawal of case from object position
- Suppression of thematic role assignment in subject position

Larson makes one amendment to the derivation of passives called argument demotion that states that a theta role must be assigned to a V' adjunct.

Argument demotion: If α is a ɵ-role assigned by X^{i}, then α may be assigned (up to optionality) to an adjunct of X^{i}

With this amended view of passive formation, Larson derives the double object construction surface representation. When the indirect object NP is moved to the VP subject position, the application of passive derivation results in the absorption of the case assigned to the indirect object, and hence the absorption of to. The theta role assigned to the subject of VP undergoes demotion, reducing the position to non-thematic status. The direct object is realized as a V' adjunct and receives its theta-role from V', consistent with argument demotion. The changes from the underlying form to derive the surface structure of the DOC are depicted in Figure 3 and summarized below.

Deep structure	Surface structure
Indirect object is caseless in its deep position	Indirect object undergoes NP movement to VP subject position
VP subject position is nonthematic and empty	Verb raises to V-head position, assigning Case to VP subject

=== Contemporary theories ===
At present, there are two major classes of analyses for dative shift; these two classes have been called the Uniform Multiple Meaning Approach (Levin, 2008) and the Single Meaning Approach (Hovav & Levin, 2008), with the former being considered the dominant approach.

==== Uniform Multiple Meaning Approach ====
In most variants of the Uniform Multiple Meaning Approach (Beck & Johnson 2004, Harley 2003, Pinker 1989), it is assumed that the relationship between the double object construction and the oblique dative forms is non-derivational. That is to say that the alternation arises not purely from syntactic factors, but from semantic ones as well; each variation is associated with its own meaning, and hence, each meaning has its own realization of arguments. This shows a clear departure from some of the main beliefs in Larson's 1988 analysis. In most realizations of this approach, dative verbs have both the caused motion meaning, expressed by the OD form and the caused possession meaning, expressed by the DOC form (Goldberg, 1995).

==== Single Meaning Approach ====
Contemporary theories that take the Single Meaning Approach continue to consider dative shift with the assertion Larson's 1988 analysis makes: that the DOC and OD variants are associated with the same semantic meaning, but surface differently due to different argument realizations (Hovav & Levin, 2008). Variants of this approach include Jackendoff's (1990), in which he provides different analyses for verbs with different types of meaning (e.g. “give” and “sell” vs “throw” and “kick” shown in the table below). This approach, also taken by Hovav and Levin (2008), is known as the Verb-Sensitive Approach.

	Give-type verbs	Throw-type verbs
Oblique dative	caused possession	caused motion or caused possession
Double object construction	caused possession	caused possession

== Psycholinguistics ==
=== Child acquisition of dative shift ===
==== General observations ====
Findings have shown that by age three children demonstrate an understanding of dative shift alternation. When presented with both alternations using novel verbs, children are more likely to shift the DOC form into the oblique dative form. For example, children were presented with novel verbs in both the double object construction and oblique dative forms:

(9) "You pilked Petey the cup" (DOC)
(10) "You gorped the keys to Toby" (oblique dative)

After hearing these two forms and then being asked to produce a corresponding alternation for one of the two, children were more likely to produce the oblique dative (11) than the double object construction (12).

(11) "I pilked the cup to Petey" (oblique dative)
(12) "I gorped Toby the keys" (DOC).

==== Baker's Paradox and original hypotheses ====
Although DOC and oblique dative forms are common productions for children at age three, the dative shift poses a paradox for young children learning English. The paradox, termed "Baker's Paradox", can be summarized in the following examples.

When children hear both forms:

(13a) Give money to him (OD)
(13b) Give him money (DOC)

Children may formulate a lexical rule, deriving the double object construction from the oblique dative form. However, the rule would permit the following example of overgeneralization:

(14a) Donate money to him. (OD)
(14b) *Donate him money. (DOC)

Example 14b is an overgeneralization because dative shift has been applied to the verb "donate", whereas in fact "donate" cannot undergo dative shift.

When children say ungrammatical sentences, they are not often corrected. How, then, do children avoid overgeneralizations such as the one above? There are two main hypotheses which try and explain how children avoid overgeneralizations, the "conservatism" hypothesis and the "criteria" hypothesis.

The "conservatism" hypothesis proposes that children do not overgeneralize the double object construction to verbs such as [donate] and [whisper] (ex. [John whispers Mary the secret]), because the child never hears ungrammatical double object constructions in their input. The child only recreates forms they hear in their input and therefore does not generalize the double object construction. This idea was first suggested by Baker (1979) who posited that children never make errors similar to those shown in (14b) and never receive information, about the ungrammaticality of (14b). Therefore, this hypothesis predicts that children acquire dative shift rules verb-by-verb, not by generalization.

The "criteria" hypothesis instead proposes that children learn to constrain their rule for dative shift and are able to apply it only to monosyllabic verbs (one-syllable verbs, ex. [give]), which indicate possession changes (ex. [Mary gave John the ball], where [give] denotes a possession change from Mary, to John). In other words, children are quite productive with their speech, applying dative shift to many verbs, but are constrained by morphophonological criteria (monosyllabic vs. polysyllabic verbs), and semantic criteria (possession change).

==== Forming a new hypothesis ====
Gropen et al. (1989) investigated these two hypotheses. According to these theorists, a strict "conservatism hypothesis" is false because children in their studies did not only use the double-object construction with verbs they had previously heard in that alternation. However, the theorists proposed a "weak conservatism hypothesis" (a less strict version of the "conservatism hypothesis") on the basis that children used verbs more often than not in the alternation they had heard them used in. With regards to the "criteria hypothesis", evidence shows that children do indeed have criteria-governed productivity, but only in a very general way.

A new hypothesis was proposed to account for everything the original hypotheses could not by combining the "weak conservatism hypothesis", the "criteria hypothesis", and lexical information. The main idea presented is that speakers acquire a "dative rule" that operates on two levels: the "broad range" and the "narrow range" levels.

On the "broad-range level" the rule applies semantically and lexically, or "lexicosemantically". In this account, the syntactic change and semantic constraints of the dative rule are consequences of a single operation, namely the lexicosemantic shift.

That is, if a verb beginning in the "X causes Y to go to Z" structure can alternate with the "X causes Z to have Y" structure and the sentence remains well-formed, then the child realizes that this verb can undergo dative shift. Figure 4, to the right, illustrates the alternation process.

Fig 4. Gropen et al.'s "broad-range" level alternation process

Verbs that undergo the "dative shift" rule must also be specified by a possessor-possession relationship. Verbs whose meanings are not cognitively compatible with the notion of a possession change will not produce a coherent semantic structure in the double object construction.

Example DOC	Alternating form	Reasons for DOC ill/well-formedness
* I drove Chicago the car.	I drove the car to Chicago.	ill-formed: the verb "drive" requires a semantic structure corresponding to 'causing Chicago to possess the car', which is nonsense if only people can be possessors.
* I drove Mary the car.	I drove the car for Mary.	ill-formed: the verb "drive" is not compatible with the notion of causing to possess
I bought Mary the car.	I bought the car for Mary.	well-formed: "buying" is a form of causing to possess.

The constraints characterized by this broad-range level form as a combination of children's lexical, semantic, and syntactic structural innate knowledge, in addition to the frequency of these forms in their input.

On the "narrow-range level" the dative rule constricts the broad-level rule, allowing it only to apply to subclasses of semantically and morphologically similar verbs. Narrow-range rules may be acquired by a procedure that is weakly conservative, in that the only verbs that the child allows to undergo dative shift freely are those verbs that they have actually heard undergo an alternation, or verbs that are semantically similar to them. The narrow subclasses of verbs are simply the set of verbs that are similar to a verb the child has heard to alternate. ‘Semantic similarity" would be defined as verbs that share most or all of their grammatically relevant semantic structure. For example, the notions of go, be, have, or act, as well as kinds of causal relations such as cause, let, and prevent, including the verbs throw and kick, all share the same general semantic structure of cause.

The final constraint of this proposed hypothesis is the morphophonological constraint. It is proposed that children will apply the morphophonological constraint to subclasses of alternating verbs that are all from the native class (monosyllabic). If the set of alternating verbs are not all from the native class, then the child will not apply the morphophonological constraint. This account correctly predicts that the morphophonological constraint could apply to some semantic subclasses, but not others. For example, children would apply the constraint to the following five subclasses of alternating verbs:

Verb class	Grammatical example	Ungrammatical example
1. giving	Lucy gave Mary the book.	*Lucy donated/contributed Mary the book.
2. communicating	Lucy told Mary the news.	*Lucy explained/announced/reported Mary the news.
3. creating	Lucy baked Mary a cake.	*Lucy constructed/designed/created Mary a cake.
4. sending	Lucy shipped Mary a parcel.	*Lucy transported Mary a parcel.
5. obtaining	Lucy bought Mary some food.	*Lucy obtained/collected Mary some food.

Children would not apply the constraint to the class of "future having" verbs because they are not all from the native (monosyllabic) class, thereby allowing the following DOC examples to be well-formed:

(15) John assigned/allotted/guaranteed/bequeathed Mary four tickets.

== Examples ==
=== Dutch ===
Similar to English, Dutch also displays the phenomenon of dative alternation: (17a) illustrates the double object construction which has an unmarked NP theme and recipient object; (17b) illustrates the oblique dative construction which has only the theme encoded as a bare NP object and the recipient is marked by a preposition. Dutch has two main approaches to the analysis of the preposition aan.

Double Object Construction: Dutch								Oblique Dative Construction: Dutch								
(17a)	NP	Aux	NP_{RECIPIENT/DATIVE}		NP_{THEME}		V	(17b)	NP1	Aux	NP_{THEME}NP		P	NP_{RECIPIENT/DATIVE}		
(17a)	Jan	heeft	zijn	broer	een	boek	gegeven.	(17b)	Jan	heeft	een	boek	aan	zijn	broer	gegeven.
(17a)	John	has	his	brother	a	book	given	(17b)	John	has	a	book	to	his	brother	given
(17a)	'John has given his brother a book.'							(17b)	'John has given a book to his brother.'							

==== Caused-motion approach ====
The Dutch prepositional phrase aan is typically analyzed in spatial terms. Van Belle and Van Langendonck (1996) suggest that one of the major semantic determinants of the dative alternation in Dutch is +/- material transfer. When the DOC form is used it highlights the involvement of the recipient, whereas when the OD form is used it emphasizes the literal physical transfer of the book. This idea of material transfer is further demonstrated in the following sentences:

(18a) Dutch: Vader bood oma zijn arm aan. (DOC)

English translation: Father offered Grandma his arm

(18b) Dutch: Vader bood zijn arm aan oma aan (OD)

English translation: Father offered his arm to grandma

In Dutch, sentence 18a, would be interpreted semantically as [Vader] offering [oma] his arm, presumably to help her walk. When the oblique dative form is used, as in sentence 18b, it would be semantically interpreted as [Vader] physically cutting off of his arm to give to [Oma] because it implies that a material transfer is involved. Supporters of the caused-motion analysis believe the +/- material transfer is only one of the major semantic determinants used in the analysis of the Dutch alternation, but nonetheless it still plays an important role.

==== Dative approach ====
De Schutter et al. (1974) argue against the caused motion analysis of the prepositional phrase aan. De Schutter uses example sentences, such as the ones in 19, to demonstrate that the semantic distinction between the Dutch DOC and the aan dative cannot be described in terms of ‘caused possession’ versus ‘caused motion’. This is because the unmarked construction for these sentences is the Oblique Dative construction despite the sentence itself not involving a spatial transfer. According to this approach the aan phrase of the aan dative is a prepositional object which is able to encode a variety of semantic roles.

(19a) Dutch: Ik bracht een laatste groet aan mijn geboortedorp. (OD)

English translation: ‘I paid a last salute to the village of my birth.'

(19b) Dutch: ?Ik bracht mijn geboortedorp een laatste groet. (DOC)

English translation: 'I paid the village of my birth a last salute'

=== Mandarin ===
Liu (2006) provides a classification of Mandarin verbs into categories and argues that the verb classes have intrinsic restrictions on which of the three dative constructions the verb can occur in. Chinese dative constructions involve gei, meaning "give/to". The gei-OD construction in (16a) is the equivalent of the English oblique dative form in which the dative prepositional phrase is [_{PP.DATIVE} gei object]. The Mandarin DOC construction in (16b) parallels the English double object construction. In addition, Mandarin has the V+gei DOC in (16c).

Mandarin gei object construction (gel Oblique Dative)
(16a)	NP1	V	NP2	gei	NP3
(16a)	Wo; 1SG	song -le {give as present} -PERF	yiben shu one.CL book	gei to	ta 3SG
(16a)	'I gave (as a present) a book to him.' (lit. 'I gifted a book to him.')				

Mandarin double object construction (DOC)
(16b)	NP1	V	NP2	NP3
(16b)	Wo; 1SG	song {give as present}	ta 3SG	yiben shu one.CL book
(16b)	I gave (as a present) him a book.’ (Literally 'I gifted him a book')			

Mandarin V+gei double object construction (V+gei DOC) (gei forms compound with preceding verb)
(16c)	NP1	V-gei	NP2	NP3
(16c)	Wo; 1SG	song -gei {give as present} -to	ta 3SG	yiben shu one.CL book
(16c)	I gave (as a present) to him a book.’ (Literally 'I gifted to him a book')			

Liu shows that the 3-way dative alternation illustrated in (16-18) is very restricted in Mandarin, as it is only possible with verbs whose core meaning involves transfer of possession. Specifically, only verbs that select an argument with the role of recipient are licit in all three constructions, as they encode transfer of possession to the recipient. This means that while English allows the dative alternation — that is, both the oblique dative and the double object construction — with verbs that have an extended meaning of transfer such as verbs that select a goal or benefactive argument, Mandarin does not. This results in a more restricted distribution of verbs in dative alternations in Mandarin compared to English. Ai & Chen (2008) further show that Mandarin only allows the dative alternation with verbs that select a goal argument. This is shown by the ungrammaticality of sentences in Chinese with a verb that selects a benefactive argument such as jian "build". Ai & Chen argue that, in Mandarin, the benefactive argument attached as an adjunct to VP: because it is outside the local domain of the verb it is not subcategorized by the verb, and so cannot alternate with the theme argument.

* Wo jian -le Zhangsan yi-dong fangzi.
{} I build -PERF Zhangsan one-CL house
[Intended: ‘I built Zhangsan a house.’]

=== Korean ===
Similar to English, Lee (1997) suggests that both oblique dative and double object construction occur in Korean.

In the OD, instead of using the verb to/for, a recipient is marked by the dative marker [-ey/eykey]. This marker denotes what Levin (2010) calls "give-type verbs" that demonstrate caused possession.

John-i Mary-eykey mwul-ul cwu-ess-ta
John-NOM Mary-DAT water-ACC give-PST-IND
'John gave water to Mary'

This differs from similar constructions using the dative marker [-eyse/eykeyse] that indicates a locative or source argument. This marks "send-type verbs" that denote caused motion.

John-un Seoul-eyse/*ey hankwuke-lul kongpwuha-ess-ta
John-TOP Seoul-in/DAT Korean-ACC study-PST-IND
'John studied Korean in Seoul'

Na-nun ky si-lul i chayk-eyse/*ey inyongha-ess-ta
I-TOP the poem-ACC this book-from.DAT cite-PST-IND
'I cited the poem from this book'

Levin suggests that Korean adopts the Verb-Sensitive Approach which predicts that dative verbs are distinctly associated with event types. This approach was proposed as an extension of the contemporary Single Meaning Approach, mentioned above.

One of the differences between Korean and English is that verbs only appear in the final position of a sentence in Korean, adopting a subject-object-verb (SOV) word order, whereas the majority of English sentences are formed with the subject-verb-object (SVO) structure. Baek and Lee (2004) suggested that Korean also displays an asymmetrical relation between the theme phrase and goal phrase. Unlike English which demonstrates the goal phrase c-commanding the theme phrase, Korean shows an opposite order, in which the theme phrase is in fact c-commanding the goal phrase.

The example below, given in Larson's (1988) work, shows the theme phrase being c-commanded by the goal phrase in the double object construction in English.

(23a) I showed John himself
(23b) *I showed himself John.

In order to further understand the theme–goal structure in Korean, Baek and Lee (2004) propose two explanations, "backwards binding" and "quantifier scope".

The backwards-binding approach helps demonstrate binding theory which requires an antecedent to c-command an anaphor.

Mary-nun {[seolo-uy chinkwu]-lul} {[Ann-kwa Peter]-eykey} poyecwuesta
Mary-TOP {each other's friends-DAT} {Ann and Peter-ACC} showed.
'Mary showed each other's friends Ann and Peter.'

The above example shows that it is possible to have backwards binding in the Korean double object construction, in which the theme can be backwardly bound to the goal. The goal phrase [seolo] is c-commanded by the theme phrase [Ann-kwa Peter], thus supporting the observation that Korean exhibits a Theme-Goal order.

Quantifier scope theory also supports the theme–goal structure introduced previously. When there is more than one quantifier involved in a DOC example in Korean, the dative–accusative (goal–theme) construction causes ambiguity while the opposite structure does not. An example provided by Baek and Lee (2004) is as follows:

Ambiguous case:

Mary-nun motun hagsaeng-eykey etten eumsig-lul cwuessta
Mary-TOP every student-DAT some food-ACC gave.
'Mary gave every student some food'

Unambiguous case:

Mary-nun motun eumsig-lul etten hagsaeng-eykey cwuessta
Mary-TOP every food-ACC some student-DAT gave.
'Mary gave every food to some student'

In (25a), the example shows that the sentence appears to be ambiguous when the quantifier with the dative case precedes the quantifier with the accusative case, but not vice versa. In fact, (25b) helps to demonstrate that the goal phrase which is located at its base-generated position solves the ambiguity problem by participating in the scope interaction, which is consistent with the theme–goal analysis in Korean.

== See also ==
- Dative
- Case role
- Argument structure
- Object (grammar)
- Secundative language
