= Ditransitive verb =

Verb which takes a subject and two objects

In grammar, a ditransitive (or bitransitive) verb is a transitive verb whose contextual use corresponds to a subject and two objects which refer to a theme and a recipient. According to certain linguistics considerations, these objects may be called direct and indirect, or primary and secondary. This is in contrast to monotransitive verbs, whose contextual use corresponds to only one object.

In languages which mark grammatical case, it is common to differentiate the objects of a ditransitive verb using, for example, the accusative case for the direct object, and the dative case for the indirect object (but this morphological alignment is not unique; see below). In languages without morphological case (such as English for the most part) the objects are distinguished by word order or context.

== In English ==
English has a number of generally ditransitive verbs, such as give, grant, and tell and many transitive verbs that can take an additional argument (commonly a beneficiary or target of the action), such as pass, read, bake, etc.:

He gave Mary ten dollars.
He passed Paul the ball.
Jean read him the books.
She is baking him a cake.
I am mailing Sam some lemons.

Alternatively, English grammar allows for these sentences to be written with a preposition (to or for): (See also Dative shift)

He gave ten dollars to Mary.
He passed the ball to Paul.
Jean read the books to/for him.
She is baking a cake for him.
I am mailing some lemons to Sam., etc.

The latter form is grammatically correct in every case, but in some dialects the former (without a preposition) is considered ungrammatical, or at least unnatural-sounding, when the direct object is a pronoun (as in He gave me it or He gave Fred it).

Sometimes one of the forms is perceived as wrong for idiosyncratic reasons (idioms tend to be fixed in form) or the verb simply dictates one of the patterns and excludes the other:

*Give a break to me (grammatical, but always phrased Give me a break)
*He introduced Susan his brother (usually phrased He introduced his brother to Susan)

In certain dialects of English, many verbs not normally treated as ditransitive are allowed to take a second object that shows a beneficiary, generally of an action performed for oneself.

Let's catch ourselves some fish (which might also be phrased Let's catch some fish for ourselves)

This construction could also be an extension of a reflexive construction.

In addition, certain ditransitive verbs can also act as monotransitive verbs:

"David told a story to the children" – Ditransitive
"David told a story – Monotransitive

=== Passive voice ===
Many ditransitive verbs have a passive voice form which can take a direct object. Contrast the active and two forms of the passive:

Active:

Jean gave the books to him.
Jean gave him the books.

Passive:

The books were given to him by Jean.
He was given the books by Jean.

Not all languages have a passive voice, and some that do have one (e.g. Polish) do not allow the indirect object of a ditransitive verb to be promoted to subject by passivization, as English does. In others like Dutch a passivization is possible but requires a different auxiliary: "krijgen" instead of "worden".

E.g. schenken means "to donate, to give":

Active: Jan schonk hem de boeken – John donated the books to him.
Passive: De boeken werden door Jan aan hem geschonken – The books were donated to him by John.
Pseudo-passive: Hij kreeg de boeken door Jan geschonken – He got the books donated [to him] by John.

=== Attributive ditransitive verbs ===
Another category of ditransitive verb is the attributive ditransitive verb in which the two objects are semantically an entity and a quality, a source and a result, etc. These verbs attribute one object to the other. In English, make, name, appoint, consider, turn into and others are examples:

- The state of New York made Hillary Clinton a Senator.
- I will name him Galahad.

The first object is a direct object. The second object is an object complement.

Attributive ditransitive verbs are also referred to as resultative verbs.

== Morphosyntactic alignment ==
The morphosyntactic alignment between arguments of monotransitive and ditransitive verbs is explained below. If the three arguments of a typical ditransitive verb are labeled D (for Donor; the subject of a verb like "to give" in English), T (for Theme; normally the direct object of ditransitive verb in English) and R (for Recipient, normally the indirect object in English), these can be aligned with the Agent and Patient of monotransitive verbs and the Subject of intransitive verbs in several ways, which are not predicted by whether the language is nominative–accusative, ergative–absolutive, or active–stative. Donor is always or nearly always in the same case as Agent, but different languages equate the other arguments in different ways:

- Indirective languages: D = A, T = P, with a third case for R
- Secundative languages: D = A, R = P (the 'primary object'), with a third case for T (the 'secondary object')
- Neutral or double-object languages: D = A, T = R = P
- Split-P languages: D = A, some monotransitive clauses have P = T, others have P = R

== See also ==
- Instrumental case
- Intransitive verb
- Morphosyntactic alignment
- Secundative language
- Transitive verb
- Transitivity (grammar)
- Valency (linguistics)
