= Pierrick =

Pierrick is a given name, from Brittany, diminutive of Pierre. Notable people with the name include:

- Pierrick Bourgeat (born 1976), French alpine skier
- Pierrick Capelle (born 1987), French professional footballer
- Pierrick Cros (footballer, born 1991) (born 1991), French football player
- Pierrick Cros (footballer, born 1992) (born 1992), French football player
- Pierrick Fédrigo (born 1978), French racing cyclist
- Pierrick Gunther (born 1989), French rugby player
- Pierrick Hiard (born 1955), French retired footballer
- Pierrick Lebourg (born 1989), French professional footballer
- Pierrick Lilliu (born 1986), French rock-singer
- Pierrick Rakotoharisoa (born 1991), French football player of Malagasy descent
- Pierrick Valdivia (born 1988), French footballer

== See also ==
- Pierric
