= Lucien Tesnière =

French linguist (1893–1954)

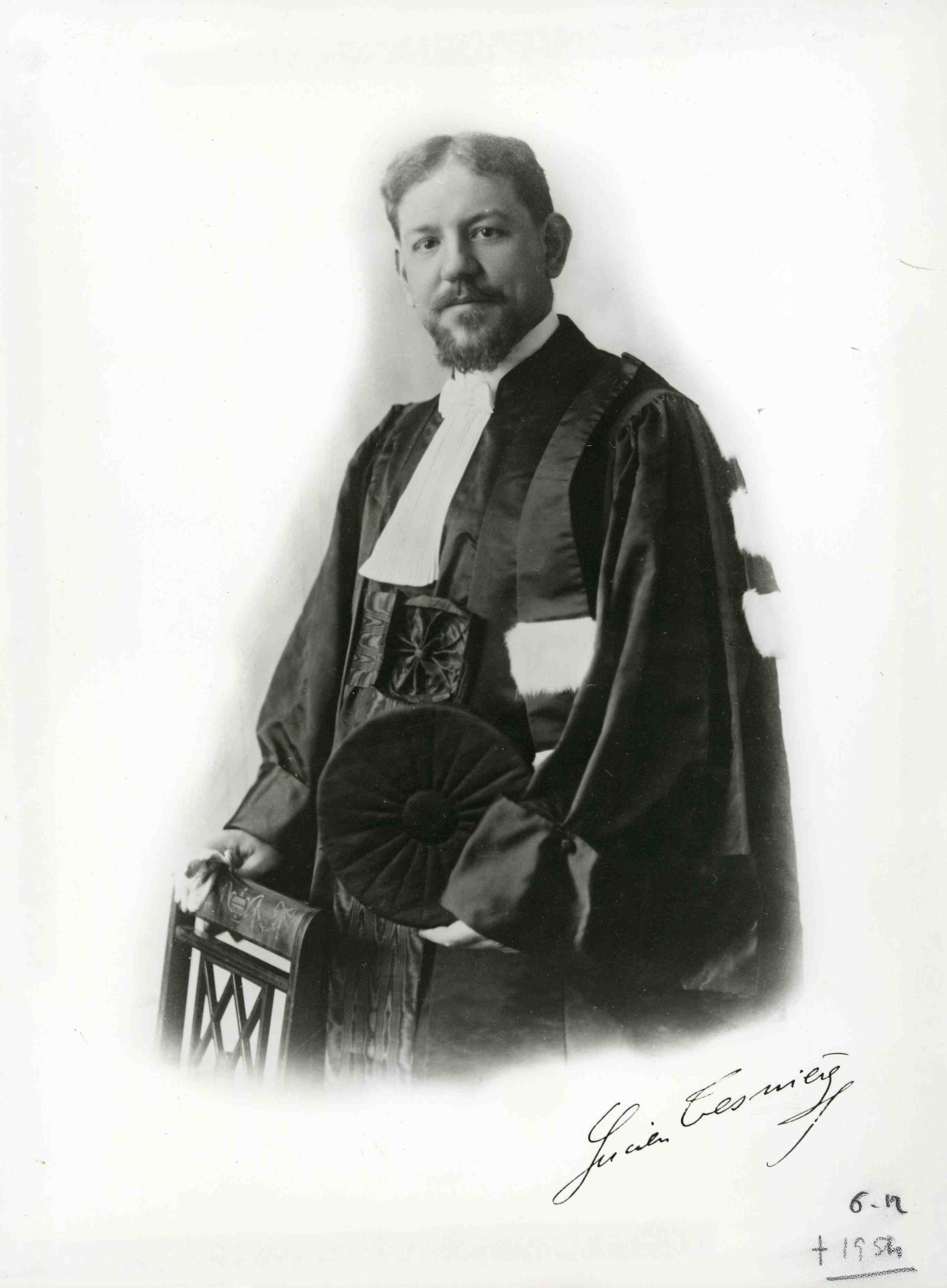
- Born: 13 May 1893; Mont-Saint-Aignan, France
- Died: 6 December 1954 (aged 61); Montpellier, France

Academic background
- Education: University of Paris
- Influences: Wilhelm von Humboldt, Ferdinand de Saussure

Academic work
- Era: 20th century
- School or tradition: Structuralism
- Institutions: University of Ljubljana; University of Strasbourg; University of Montpellier
- Main interests: Linguistics, syntax
- Notable ideas: Dependency (grammar), valency
- Influenced: Igor Mel'čuk

Lucien Tesnière (French: [lysjɛ̃ tɛnjɛʁ]; May 13, 1893 – December 6, 1954) was a prominent and influential French linguist. He was born in Mont-Saint-Aignan on May 13, 1893. As a senior lecturer at the University of Strasbourg (1924) and later professor at the University of Montpellier (1937), he published many papers and books on Slavic languages. However, his importance in the history of linguistics is based mainly on his development of an approach to the syntax of natural languages that would become known as dependency grammar. He presented his theory in his book Éléments de syntaxe structurale (Elements of Structural Syntax), published posthumously in 1959. In the book he proposes a sophisticated formalization of syntactic structures, supported by many examples from a diversity of languages. Tesnière died in Montpellier on December 6, 1954.

Many central concepts that the modern study of syntax takes for granted were developed and presented in Éléments. For instance, Tesnière developed the concept of valency in detail, and the primary distinction between arguments (actants) and adjuncts (circumstants, French circonstants), which most if not all theories of syntax now acknowledge and build on, was central to Tesnière's understanding. Tesnière also argued vehemently that syntax is autonomous from morphology and semantics, although his stance is different from generative grammar which takes syntax to be a separate module of the human faculty for language.

== Biography ==
Lucien Tesnière was born on May 13, 1893, in Mont-Saint-Aignan, now a suburb of Rouen (north-west of France). He studied Latin, Greek, and German in school, spent time abroad as a young man in England, Germany, and Italy. He was enrolled at the Sorbonne (the University of Paris) and the University of Leipzig studying Germanic languages when World War I broke out. He was mobilized on August 12 and sent to the front on October 15. He became a prisoner of war on 16 February 1915. He was interned in the camp at Merseburg with 4000 other prisoners from all nationalities. During his 40 months of captivity, he continued his intense study of languages. He also worked for the German authorities as a French-English-Russian-Italian-German interpreter.

He continued his studies at the Sorbonne after the war. He studied with Joseph Vendryes, and attended lectures at the Collège de France by Antoine Meillet, the most prominent French linguist of the first half of the 20th century. In 1920 Tesnière was invited as a lecturer in French to the University of Ljubljana (now the capital of Slovenia), where he wrote his doctoral thesis on the disappearance of the dual in Slovenian. He married Jeanne Roulier in Zagreb and fathered three children with her.

In February 1924, Tesnière became associate professor of Slavic language and literature at the University of Strasbourg, where he taught Russian and Old Slavic. Tesnière was promoted to professor of grammaire comparée at the University of Montpellier in 1937.

During World War II Tesnière worked as a cryptography officer for the Military Intelligence, the so-called Deuxième Bureau. He became very ill after the war in 1947 and his health remained poor until he died on December 6, 1954. His primary oeuvre, Éléments de syntaxe structurale, was then published five years later in 1959 due to the constant efforts of his wife Jeanne and the help of colleagues and friends. It was further revised and a second edition published in 1966.

== Central ideas in Tesnière's conception of syntax ==
The following subsections consider some of the central ideas and concepts in Tesnière's approach to syntax. The following areas are touched on: (1) connections, (2) autonomous syntax, (3) verb centrality, (4) stemmas, (5) centripetal (head-initial) and centrifugal (head-final) languages, (6) valency, (7) actants and circonstants, and (8) transfer.

=== Connections ===
Tesnière begins the presentation of his theory of syntax with the connection. Connections are present between words of sentences. They group the words together, creating units that can be assigned meaning. Tesnière writes:

"Every word in a sentence is not isolated as it is in the dictionary. The mind perceives connections between a word and its neighbors. The totality of these connections forms the scaffold of the sentence. These connections are not indicated by anything, but it is absolutely crucial that they be perceived by the mind; without them the sentence would not be intelligible. ..., a sentence of the type Alfred spoke is not composed of just the two elements Alfred and spoke, but rather of three elements, the first being Alfred, the second spoke, and the third the connection that unites them – without which there would be no sentence. To say that a sentence of the type Alfred spoke consists of only two elements is to analyze it in a superficial manner, purely morphologically, while neglecting the essential aspect that is the syntactic link."

Tesnière calls the asymmetrical connections that he describes in this passage dependencies (Chapter 2), hence the term dependency grammar. Two words that are connected by a dependency do not have equal status, but rather the one word is the superior, and the other its subordinate. Tesnière called the superior word the governor, and the inferior word the subordinate. By acknowledging the totality of connections between the words of a sentence, Tesnière was in a position to assign the sentence a concrete syntactic structure, which he did in terms of the stemma (see below).

=== Antinomy between structural and linear order ===
Tesnière rejected the influence of morphology on the field of syntax. In so doing, he was promoting a break from a tradition in linguistics that focused on concrete forms such as affixes and the inflectional paradigms associated with the study of the languages of antiquity (Latin and Greek). Tesnière argued that the study of syntax should not be limited to the examination of concrete forms, but rather one has to acknowledge and explore the connections (as just described above). He pointed to the key concept of innere Sprachform 'inner speech form' established by Wilhelm von Humboldt. Since innere Sprachform (i.e. the connections) is abstract, one cannot acknowledge it and explore the central role that it plays in syntax by focusing just on concrete forms. Tesnière was arguing, in other words, that syntax is largely independent of morphology.

Tesnière also saw syntax and semantics as separate domains of language. To illustrate this separation, he produced the nonsensical sentence Le silence vertébral indispose la voile licite 'The vertebral silence indisposes the licit sail'. He emphasized that while the sentence is nonsensical, it is well-formed from a syntactic point of view, for the forms of the words and their order of appearance are correct. Noam Chomsky later made the same point with his famous sentence Colorless green ideas sleep furiously.

Although both Tesnière and Chomsky argue for 'autonomy of syntax', their concepts are quite different and should not be confused with one another. The central issue is in language cognition which is elementary for Chomsky who claims that syntax is an innate psychological phenomenon. In contrast, Tesnière's concept of autonomy of syntax, or antinomy between structural and linear order, is fully non-psychological. Tesnière's grammar is not meant to be taken as a theory of language, but as a tool for linguistic analysis. Tesnière argues for a one-way link from meaning to expression:

“When we speak, our intent is not to find meaning afterwards in a pre-existing string of phonemes, but rather to give an easily transmissible form to a thought that precedes the form and which is its sole raison d’être”

Tesnière's concept of language is based on the idea that the meaning of a sentence resides on a semantic plane which is two-dimensional (nonlinear). The sentence, on the other hand, belongs to the expression plane which is one-dimensional (linear). When nonlinear meaning is forced into linear form, its structure will have to break. The outcome does not reflect logic or psychology, but brute necessity. Tesnière's grammar is the semantic, nonlinear analysis of the linear sentence form.

=== Verb centrality ===
Tesnière argued vehemently against the binary division of the clause into subject and predicate that was and is prevalent in the study of syntax, and he replaced this division with verb centrality. He stated that the division stems from logic and has no place in linguistics. He positioned the verb as the root of all clause structure, whereby all other elements in the clause are either directly or indirectly dependent on the verb. Tesnière illustrated the distinction with the diagrammatic representations (stemmas) of the French sentence Alfred parle lentement 'Alfred speaks slowly' and the Latin sentence Filius amat patrem '(The) son loves (the) father':

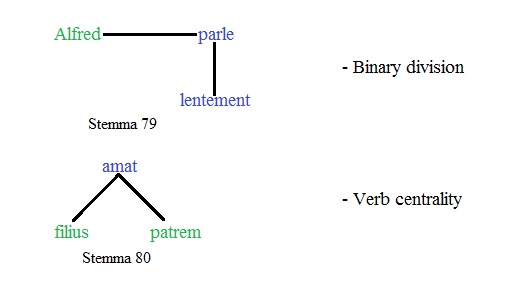

The diagram of the French sentence above illustrates the binary division that Tesnière rejected; the clause is divided into two parts, the subject Alfred and the predicate parle lentement. The Latin sentence below illustrates the verb centrality that Tesnière espoused; the verb amat is the root of the clause and the subject filius and the object patrem are its dependents. The importance of this distinction resides with the overall understanding of sentence structure that arises from these competing views. A theory of syntax that starts with the binary division is likely to become a phrase structure grammar (a constituency grammar), whereas a theory of syntax that starts with verb centrality is likely to become a dependency grammar.

=== Stemmas ===
Tesnière relied heavily on tree-like diagrams to represent the understanding of sentence structure and syntax that he was pursuing. He called these diagrams stemmas - the Éléments contains over 350 of them. These stemmas show the connections and the manner in which the connections link the words of sentences into a hierarchy of structure, e.g.

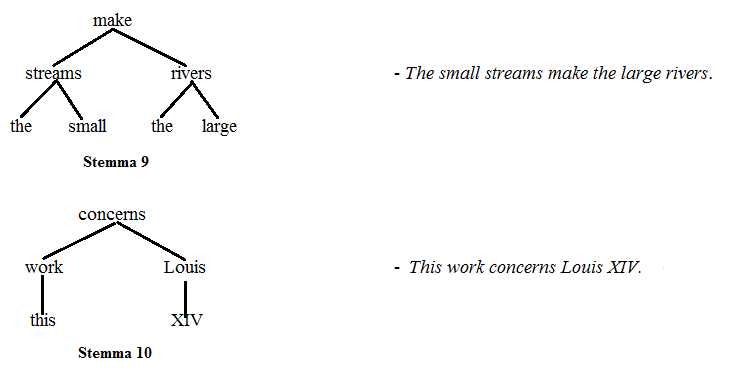

These diagrams show some of the main traits of Tesnière's conception of syntactic structure. Verb centrality is evident, since the verb is the highest word in the stemma (the root). Syntactic units are present; constituents and phrases are identified; they correspond to complete subtrees. An important aspect of these stemmas is that they are "unordered", i.e. they do not reflect actual word order. For Tesnière, structural order (hierarchical order) preceded linear order in the mind of a speaker. A speaker first conceives of what he/she wants to say, whereby this conception consists of words organized hierarchically in terms of connections (structural order). The act of speaking involves transforming structural order to linear order, and conversely, the act of hearing and understanding involves transforming linear order to structural order. This strict separation of the ordering dimensions is a point of contention among modern dependency grammars. Some dependency grammars, i.e. the stratified ones (e.g. Meaning-text theory and Functional generative description) build on this strict separation of structural order and linear order, whereas other dependency grammars (e.g. Word grammar) are monostratal (in syntax) and hence reject the separation.

=== Centrifugal (head-initial) and centripetal (head-final) languages ===
Given the hierarchical organization of syntactic units that he posited (and represented using stemmas), Tesnière identified centripetal and centrifugal structures. The modern terms for these concepts are head-initial (centrifugal) and head-final (centripetal). Centrifugal structures see governors (heads) preceding their dependents, whereas the situation is reversed for centripetal structures, the dependents preceding their heads, e.g.

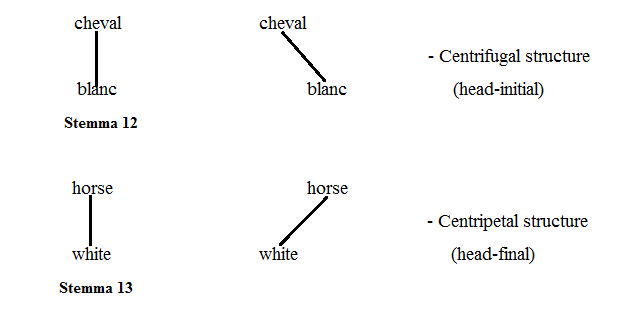

Tesnière did not actually produce "ordered" stemmas like the two on the right here. But if one does choose to reflect word order in the stemmas, then the distinction between centrifugal vs. centripetal structures that Tesnière established is clearly visible. The following two trees of the English sentences Stop attempting to do that and His sister's attempts succeeded illustrate the distinction:

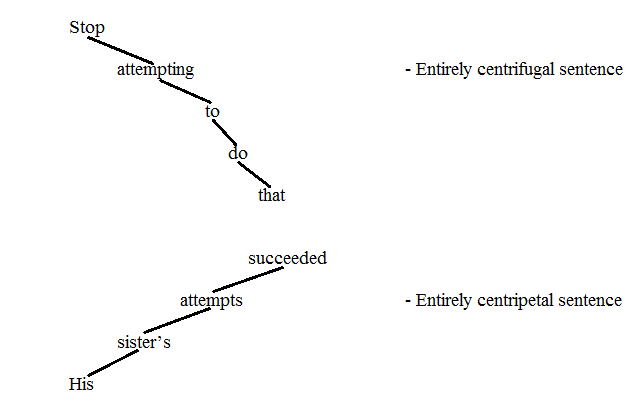

The stemmas clearly show the manner in which centrifugal structures extend down to the right, and centripetal structures down to the left. Tesnière classified languages according to whether they are more centrifugal than centripetal, or vice versa. The distinction has since become a mainstay of language typology. Languages are classified in terms of their head-directionality parameter: as predominantly head-initial or head-final. The Semitic languages (e.g. Hebrew, Arabic) are, for instance, much more centrifugal than centripetal, and certain East Asian languages are much more centripetal than centrifugal (e.g. Japanese, Korean). English is a mitigated language according to Tesnière, meaning that it contains a good mixture of both centrifugal and centripetal structures.

=== Valency ===
With the "valency" metaphor, Tesnière contributed to our understanding of the nature of the lexicon. This metaphor, borrowed from Charles Peirce, compares verbs to molecules. As an oxygen atom O attracts two hydrogen atoms H to create an H_{2}O molecule, verbs attract actants to create clauses. Verbs therefore have valency. Tesnière distinguished between verbs that are avalent (no actant), monovalent (one actant), divalent (two actants), and trivalent (three actants). English examples:

Avalent verb: It rained. - The verb rain is avalent. (The pronoun it is devoid of meaning.)

Monovalent verb: Sam slept. - The verb sleep is monovalent; it takes a single actant.

Divalent verb: Susan knows Sam. - The verb know is divalent; it takes two actants, a subject actant and an object actant.

Trivalent verb: Sam gave Susan earrings. - The verb give is trivalent; it takes three actants, a subject actant, and two object actants.

The valency characteristics of verbs play a role in the exploration of various mechanisms of syntax. In particular, various phenomena of diathesis (active, passive, reflexive, reciprocal, recessive) are sensitive to the underlying valency of verbs. The concept of valency is now widely acknowledged in the study of syntax, even most phrase structure grammars acknowledging the valency of predicates.

=== Actants vs. circumstants ===
In addition to actants, Tesnière acknowledged circumstants (French circonstants). While the actants that appear with a verb are important for completing the meaning of the verb, circumstants add optional content, e.g.

Tomorrow Alfred is leaving at noon. - The circumstants tomorrow and at noon add optional content.

One sees him a lot all the time everywhere. - The circumstants a lot, all the time, and everywhere add optional content.

The number of actants that appear in a clause is limited by the valency characteristics of the clause-establishing verb, whereas the number of circumstants that can appear in a clause is theoretically unlimited, since circumstants are not restricted by verb valency. Modern syntax acknowledges actants and circumstants of course also, although it uses different terminology. Actants are known as arguments, and circumstants as adjuncts, so again, Tesnière identified and explored key concepts that are now a mainstay in the modern study of syntax.

=== Transfer ===
The second half of the Éléments (300 pages) focuses on the theory of transfer (French translation). Transfer is the component of Tesnière's theory that addresses syntactic categories. Tesnière was interested in keeping the number of principle syntactic categories to a minimum. He acknowledged just four basic categories of content words: nouns (O), verbs (I), adjectives (A), and adverbs (E). The abbreviations he used for these words (O, I, A, E) match the last letter of the corresponding Esperanto designations. In addition to these four basic content words, he also posited two types of function words, indices and translatives. He took articles (definite and indefinite) and clitic pronouns to be indices, and typical translatives were subordinators (subordinate conjunctions) and prepositions. The main task translatives perform is to transfer content words from one category to another. For instance, prepositions typically transfer nouns to adjectives or adverbs, and subordinators typically transfer verbs to nouns. For example, in the phrase le livre de Pierre 'the book of Peter, Peter's book', the preposition de serves to transfer the noun Pierre to an adjective that can modify the noun livre. In other words, the noun Pierre, although it is technically not an adjective, comes to function like an adjective by the addition of the translative de. Transfer is represented in stemmas using a special convention. The following stemmas represent the phrase de Pierre 'of Peter' and the sentence Écrivez dans le livre de votre ami 'Write in the book of your friend':

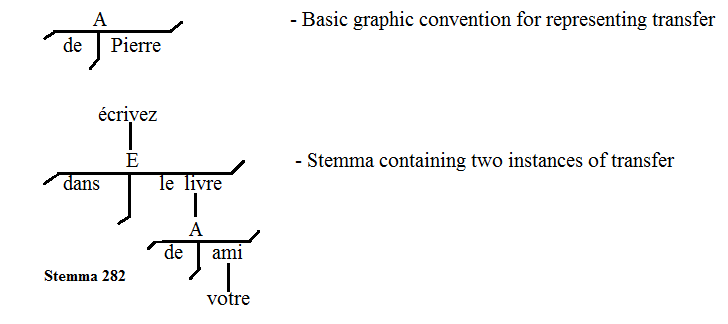

The translative and the word that it transfers are placed equi-level and a vertical dividing line separates them. The target category, i.e. the category that is the result of transfer, is indicated above the horizontal line. In the first stemma above, the A indicates that Pierre has been transferred (by de) to an adjective. The stemma below shows two instances of transfer, whereby the first indicates that dans livre de votre ami is transferred to an adverb, and the second that de votre ami is transferred to an adjective.

For Tesnière, the ability to transfer one category to another at will in fluid speech is the primary tool that makes truly productive speech possible. Syntactic categories that alone are not capable of combining with each other can be immediately unified by a translative that effects transfer.

== Legacy ==
Tesnière's legacy resides primarily with the widespread view that sees his Éléments as the starting point and impetus for the development of dependency grammar. Thus the frameworks of syntax and grammar that are dependency-based (e.g. Word grammar, Meaning-text theory, Functional generative description) generally cite Tesnière as the father of modern dependency grammars. Tesnière himself did not set out to produce a dependency grammar, since the distinction between dependency- and constituency-based grammars (phrase structure grammars) was not known to linguistics while Tesnière was alive. The distinction first became established during the reception of Tesnière's ideas.

Tesnière's legacy is not limited to the development of dependency grammar, however. As stated above, a number of the key concepts that he developed (e.g. valency, arguments vs. adjuncts, head-initial vs head-final languages) are cornerstones of most modern work in the field of syntax. Tesnière does not receive the full credit that he perhaps deserves for his contribution to the field of syntax. Tesnière died shortly before the initiation of generative grammar, and his Éléments remained untranslated to English until 2015. Thus his influence has been greater in Europe than in English-speaking North America.

== See also ==
- Adjunct
- Argument
- Dependency grammar
- Government
- Head
- Phrase structure grammar
- Predicate
- Subject
- Valency

== Main works ==
- 1934. Petite grammaire russe. Paris: Henri Didier.
- 1938. Cours élémentaire de syntaxe structurale.
- 1943. Cours de syntaxe structurale.
- 1953. Esquisse d'une syntaxe structurale. Paris: Klincksieck.
- 1959. Éléments de syntaxe structurale. Paris: Klincksieck. ISBN 2-252-01861-5
  - 1965. Revised and corrected 2nd edition. Preface by Jean Fourquet, professor at Sorbonne. ISBN 2-252-02620-0
  - 2015. Elements of Structural Syntax [English translation of 1965 2dn edn]. Trans. Timothy Osborne & Sylvain Kahane. Amsterdam: John Benjamins.

== Secondary works ==
- Timothy Osborne & Sylvain Kahane. ‘Translators' introduction’, in Elements of structural syntax. Amsterdam: John Benjamins, 2015.
