= Lebourg =

Lebourg is a surname. Notable people with the surname include:

- Albert Lebourg (1849–1928), French Impressionist and Post-Impressionist landscape painter of the Rouen School
- Charles-Auguste Lebourg (1829–1906), French sculptor
- Nicolas Lebourg (born 1974), French historian
- Pierrick Lebourg (born 1989), French professional footballer
