= Circassian morphology =

Verbal morphology of the Circassian (Adyghe–Kabardian) languages

In the Circassian languages, as in all Northwest Caucasian languages, morphology is the most important part of the grammar. Circassian is polysynthetic and the bulk of its grammatical machinery is concentrated in the verb. The branch has two literary standards: Adyghe (West Circassian) and Kabardian (East Circassian, also called Kabardian-Cherkess). They share the great majority of their verbal morphology; where a category is expressed slightly differently in the two standards, this article presents the forms side by side.

A Circassian word, besides having its own lexical meaning, can by the set of morphemes it is built of, and by their aggregate grammatical meanings, reproduce a whole sentence. A verb can express the person, number and place of its subject and objects, as well as tense, mood, manner of action, direction, location, causation, negation and many other categories. For example, Adyghe къыпфэсхьыщтэп "I will not bring it for you" consists of the morphemes къы-п-фэ-с-хьы-щт-эп, literally "from there (къы) you (п) for you (фэ) I (с) bring (хьы) will (future tense – щт) not (эп)". A Kabardian form such as къызэрызыхуэмышэжыфынумэ likewise packs more than a dozen morphemes into a single word that would require an entire clause to translate into English.

The morphemes are grouped here by their position relative to the root: verbal prefixes (before the root — argument relations, version, voice, deixis and direction), verbal infixes (inside the verb complex, most notably the negator -мы-), and verbal suffixes (after the root — tense, aspect, mood and derivation). A large and characteristic class of prefixes, the positional (locative) preverbs, is treated in its own section because of its systematic conjugational behaviour.

== Structure of the verbal complex ==
Adyghe (West Circassian) and Kabardian (East Circassian) are closely related Northwest Caucasian languages whose verbs are built on a single, highly templatic polysynthetic model. In both languages the verb root is surrounded by a rigid sequence of prefixal and suffixal slots, numbered here from −12 (leftmost prefix) through 0 (the root) to +7 (rightmost suffix). The prefixal slots form an argument-structure zone, in which the verb cross-references its absolutive, oblique (indirect-object) and ergative (agent) participants, followed by a smaller set of pre-stem elements; the suffixal slots encode categories such as aspect, tense, mood, negation and plurality. The two languages largely share this template and differ mainly in the phonological shape of individual affixes, as set out below.

=== Slot template (overview) ===
Order of slots in the verb (negative = prefix, 0 = root, positive = suffix)
Prefixes												Root	Suffixes						
−12	−11	−10	−9	−8	−7	−6	−5	−4	−3	−2	−1	0	+1	+2	+3	+4	+5	+6	+7
Abs	Cisl/ Transl	Manner/ Fact	IO (Obl)	Appl	Loc	Prep	Agt (Erg)	Dyn	Opt/ Juss	Neg	Caus	√ ROOT	Rep	Pot	Tense	Real	Pl	Dyn	Mood/ Neg

=== Markers filling each slot ===
Combined structure of the Adyghe (ady) and Kabardian (kbd) verbal complex
Slot	Category	Adyghe	Kabardian	Gloss / meaning
−12	Absolutive	с-		1SG
−12	Absolutive	у-		2SG
−12	Absolutive	т-	д-	1PL
−12	Absolutive	шъу-	ф-	2PL
−12	Absolutive	∅		3 (no overt marker)
−11	Cislocative / Translocative	къ-		hither (cislocative)
−11	Cislocative / Translocative	—	ны-	toward (translocative)
−10	Manner / Factive	зэрэ-	зэры-	the way that…; factive
−9	Indirect object (Oblique)	с-		1SG
−9	Indirect object (Oblique)	у-, п-		2SG
−9	Indirect object (Oblique)	т-	д-	1PL
−9	Indirect object (Oblique)	шъу-	ф-	2PL
−9	Indirect object (Oblique)	е-		3SG
−9	Indirect object (Oblique)	а-, я-		3PL
−8	Applicative	фэ-	хуэ-	for (benefactive)
−8	Applicative	шӀо-	фӀэ-	against (malefactive)
−8	Applicative	дэ-		with (comitative)
−7	Locative	щы-		at
−6	Prepositional (locative preverbs)	те-		on
−6	Prepositional (locative preverbs)	чӀэ-	щӀэ-	under
−6	Prepositional (locative preverbs)	хэ-		within / among
−6	Prepositional (locative preverbs)	дэ-		in
−6	Prepositional (locative preverbs)	пы-		on / attached to
−6	Prepositional (locative preverbs)	и-		in(side)
−6	Prepositional (locative preverbs)	къо-	къуэ-	behind
−6	Prepositional (locative preverbs)	Ӏу-		at / near
−6	Prepositional (locative preverbs)	го-	гуэ-	beside
−6	Prepositional (locative preverbs)	бгъодэ-	—	beside / next to
−6	Prepositional (locative preverbs)	кӀоцӀы-	кӀуэцӀы-	within / inside
−5	Agent (Ergative)	с-		1SG
−5	Agent (Ergative)	у-		2SG
−5	Agent (Ergative)	т-	д-	1PL
−5	Agent (Ergative)	шъу-	ф-	2PL
−5	Agent (Ergative)	е-	и-	3SG
−5	Agent (Ergative)	а-, я-		3PL
−4	'Dynamic' prefix	мэ-		3rd person
−4	'Dynamic' prefix	э-	о-	positive present
−3	Optative / Jussive	рэ-		optative / jussive
−2	Negation	мы-		negation (preverbal NEG)
−1	Causative	гъэ-		causative (CAUS)
0	Root	[verb]		verb stem
+1	Repetition	-жь	-ж	again (re-)
+2	Potential	-шъу	-ф	can / be able to
+3	Tense	-гъэ	-ащ	past (PST)
+3	Tense	-щт	-ну	future (FUT)
+3	Tense	-щтыгъ	-(р)т	imperfect (IMPF)
+3	Tense	-гъагъ	-ат	past perfect (PP)
+4	Realization / Completion	-х		realization / completion
+5	Plural	-х	-хэ	3rd person plural absolutive (PL)
+6	Dynamic suffix	-рэ		dynamic suffix
+7	Mood / Negation	-п	-къым	negative (NEG)
+7	Mood / Negation	-мэ		conditional (COND)
+7	Mood / Negation	-ми		concessive (CONC)
+7	Mood / Negation	-а	—	interrogative (Q)
+7	Mood / Negation	-ба	-къэ	negative interrogative (NEG.Q)
+7	Mood / Negation	-и		and (additive)
+7	Mood / Negation	-эу	-у	adverbial (ADV)

== Verbal prefixes ==
Circassian verbal prefixes fall into several functional groups: causative and voice prefixes, which change the verb's argument structure; version prefixes (benefactive, malefactive, involuntative, instrumental), which add an affected participant; deictic direction (motion toward the speaker or addressee); and a large set of positional/locative preverbs, treated separately in the § Preverbs section. Except where noted, the two standards use cognate or identical prefixes. In the Adyghe tradition these are divided into directional prefixes (expressing the direction of the verb) and informative prefixes (adding location, reason or participants).

=== Causative (гъэ-) ===
The causative prefix гъэ- [ʁa-] (Kabardian гъэ- [ʁa-]), identical in both standards, marks that the subject causes, forces, makes, orders, allows or enables the action; it derives transitives from intransitives, raising valency by one, and can stack to form a double causative. Every verb class — intransitive, transitive, even ditransitive — can be causativised, and гъэ- also forms transitive verbs from nouns and adjectives.

Verb forms
Adyghe	Kabardian	Meaning
шхэн → гъэшхэн	шхэн → гъэшхэн	"eat" → "to feed (make eat)"
кӀон → гъэкӀон	кӀуэн → гъэкӀуэн	"go" → "to make (sb) go"
гущыӀэн → гъэгущыӀэн	псэлъэн → гъэпсэлъэн	"speak" → "to make (sb) talk"
чъыен → гъэчъыен	жеин → гъэжеин	"sleep" → "to put (sb) to sleep"
фабэ → гъэфэбэн	хуабэ → гъэхуэбэн	"hot" → "to heat (it)" (deadjectival)

Example sentences
Adyghe	Kabardian	Meaning
Фылымым сегъэплъ.	Фильмым сегъэплъ.	"Let me watch the film."
Янэм сабыйр ыгъэчъыягъ.	Анэм сабийр игъэжеящ.	"The mother put the child to sleep."
Сэ пшъашъэм есгъэгъашхэ шхыныр кӀэлэцӀыкӀум.	Сэ хъыджэбзым шхыныр сабийм ригъэгъэшхэ.	"I am making the girl feed the little boy" (double causative)

=== Causative reflexive (зыгъэ-) ===
A causative whose causee is the subject acting on itself; the prefix зыгъэ- [zəʁa-] (Kabardian зыгъэ-) is identical in both standards.

Verb forms
Adyghe	Kabardian	Meaning
фабэ → зыгъэфэбэн	хуабэ → зыгъэхуэбэн	"hot" → "to warm oneself"
дахэ → зыгъэдэхэн	дахэ → зыгъэдэхэн	"pretty" → "to make oneself pretty"
зыгъэпсэфын	зыгъэпсэхун	"to rest oneself"
зыгъэхьазырын	зыгъэхьэзырын	"to prepare oneself"

Example sentences
Adyghe	Kabardian	Meaning
КӀалэм зыкъемыгъэдел.	ЩӀалэм зыкъемыгъэделэ.	"Don't let the boy fool you."

=== Reflexive (зы-) ===
The reflexive prefix marks an action the subject performs on itself: Adyghe зы-/зэ- [zə-] (usually with the suffix -жьы), Kabardian зы-/з-.

Verb forms
Adyghe	Kabardian	Meaning
зэплъыжьын	зыплъыжын	"to look at oneself"
зэукӀыжьын	зыукӀыжын	"to kill oneself"
зылъэшӀыжьын	зылъэщӀын	"to wipe oneself"
зыплъыхьын	зыплъыхьын	"to look about oneself"
зэлъэфэлӀэжьын	зэлъэфэлӀэн	"to drag (something) to oneself"

Example sentences
Adyghe	Kabardian	Meaning
ГъунджэмкӀэ зэплъыжь.	ГъуджэмкӀэ зыплъыж.	"Look at yourself in the mirror."

=== Reciprocal (зэ-) ===
The reciprocal prefix зэ- [za-] (Kabardian зэ-) forms verbs in which participants act on each other; Adyghe also uses зэры- for reciprocals of transitives.

Verb forms
Adyghe	Kabardian	Meaning
зэрылъэгъун	зэлъагъун	"to see each other"
зэзэон	зэзэуэн	"to fight each other"

Example sentences
Adyghe	Kabardian	Meaning
КӀалэмрэ пшъашъэмрэ зэбэух.	ЩӀалэмрэ хъыджэбзымрэ зэбэуэх.	"The boy and the girl are kissing each other."
Оррэ сэррэ тызэрэлъэгъу.	Уэрэ сэрэ дызэролъагъу.	"You and I, we see each other."

=== Reciprocal and reflexive of transitives (зэрэ- / зытэ-) ===
With transitive verbs Adyghe distinguishes a reciprocal зэрэ- ("to each other") from a reflexive зытэ- ("ourselves, oneself"); both occur only with transitive stems. The infinitive (masdar) carries no dynamic/person prefix — зэрэукӀыжьын "to kill each other" — whereas the finite present adds a personal prefix: тызэрэукӀыжьы "we kill each other". The reciprocal and reflexive contrast minimally — тызэрэукӀыжьы "we kill each other" versus зытэукӀыжьы "we kill ourselves". Kabardian forms the reciprocal with зэр(ы)- (дызэро- "we … each other").

Reciprocal зэрэ- — "(to) each other"
Adyghe — infinitive	Adyghe — present (1 pl.)	Kabardian — present (1 pl.)	Meaning
зэрэукӀыжьын	тызэрэукӀыжьы	дызэроукӀ	"(to) kill each other"
зэрэлъэгъужьын	тызэрэлъэгъужьы	дызэролъагъу	"(to) see each other"
зэрэшӀэжьын	тызэрэшӀэжьы	дызэроцӀыху	"(to) know each other"

Reflexive зытэ- — "ourselves"
Adyghe — present (1 pl.)	Kabardian — present (1 pl.)	Meaning
зытэукӀыжьы	зыдоукӀыж	"we kill ourselves"
зытэлъэгъужьы	зыдолъагъуж	"we see ourselves"
зытэшӀэжьы	зыкъыдоцӀыхуж	"we know ourselves"

=== Comitative (дэ-) ===
The comitative prefix дэ- [da-] (Kabardian дэ-) marks an action done jointly with, or staying with, somebody. It is a homophone of the locative/positional дэ- ("in an enclosed area").

Verb forms
Adyghe	Kabardian	Meaning
шхэн → дэшхэн	шхэн → дэшхэн	"eat" → "to eat with somebody"
макӀо → дакӀо	мэкӀуэ → докӀуэ	"is going" → "is going with somebody"

Example sentences
Adyghe	Kabardian	Meaning
КӀалэр пшъашъэм дакӀо.	ЩӀалэр хъыджэбзым докӀуэ.	"The boy is going with the girl."
КӀалэр лӀыхэмэ адэлажьэ.	ЩӀалэр лӀыхэм ядолажьэ.	"The boy is working with the men."

=== Sociative / joint action (зэдэ-) ===
The prefix зэдэ- [zada-] (identical in both standards) marks an action done collectively, together (reciprocal with a comitative nuance).

Verb forms
Adyghe	Kabardian	Meaning
зэдэхьащхын	зэдэгушыӀэн	"to joke with one another"
зэдэлэжьэн	зэдэлэжьэн	"to work together"
кӀон → зэдэкӀон	кӀуэн → зэдэкӀуэн	"to walk" → "to walk together"

Example sentences
Adyghe	Kabardian	Meaning
Сиунэ тисэу тызэдэшхэщт.	Си унэ дису дызэдэшхэнщ.	"We will eat together in my house."

=== Benefactive (хуэ- / фэ-) ===
The benefactive prefix (Adyghe фэ- [fa-], Kabardian хуэ- [xʷa-]) marks an action done for somebody's benefit or sake. The two standards differ by the regular correspondence Adyghe ф ↔ Kabardian ху.

Verb forms
Adyghe	Kabardian	Meaning
макӀо → факӀо	мэкӀуэ → хуокӀуэ	"is going" → "is going for somebody"
Ӏоф фэшӀэн	Ӏуэху хуэщӀэн	"to do work for somebody"
тхылъ фэщэфын	тхылъ хуэщэхун	"to buy a book for somebody"

Example sentences
Adyghe	Kabardian	Meaning
КӀалэр ыянэ тучаным фэкӀо.	ЩӀалэр и анэм тучаным хуокӀуэ.	"The boy is going to the shop for his mother."
Ащ непэ гъончэдж зыфищэфыжьыгъ.	Абы нобэ гъуэншэдж зыхуищэхужащ.	"Today (s)he bought trousers for himself/herself."

=== Malefactive / against one's interest (фӀэ- / шӀо-) ===
The malefactive (adversative) prefix (Adyghe шӀо- [ʃʷʼa-], Kabardian фӀэ- [fʼa-]) marks an action against somebody's will or interest, or taking an object or an opportunity away from them. The forms differ by Adyghe шӀ [ʃʷʼ] ↔ Kabardian фӀ [fʼ].

Verb forms
Adyghe	Kabardian	Meaning
кӀон → шӀокӀон	кӀуэн → фӀэкӀуэн	"to go" → "to go against somebody's wish"
шхэн → шӀошхын	шхэн → фӀэшхын	"to eat" → "to eat (something) to another's detriment"
етыгъу → шӀуетыгъу	едыгъу → фӀедыгъу	"steals it" → "steals it from him"

Example sentences
Adyghe	Kabardian	Meaning
КӀалэм мыӀэрысыр къэсшӀуешхы.	ЩӀалэм мыӀэрысэр къысфӀешх.	"The boy is eating the apple against my interest."
Пшъашъэм мыӀэрысхэр шӀуештэжьых.	Хъыджэбзым мыӀэрысэхэр фӀештэжых.	"The girl is taking the apples away."

=== Involuntative / unintentional (ӀэщӀэ- / ӀэкӀэ-) ===
The involuntative prefix marks an action done unintentionally or accidentally — a notable feature of Circassian, which encodes accidentality directly in the verb where many languages would use an adverb. The forms are cognate: Adyghe ӀэкӀэ- [ʔat͡ʃʼa-] ≈ Kabardian ӀэщӀэ- [ʔaɕʼa-]. Not listed in Jaimoukha's book; the Kabardian forms are otherwise sourced.

Example sentences
Adyghe	Kabardian	Meaning
Хьэм баджэр ӀэкӀэтхьалыхьагъ.	Хьэм бажэр ӀэщӀэтхьэлыхьащ.	"The dog slaughtered the fox (unintentionally)."
О усӀэкӀэукӀагъ.	Уэ усӀэщӀэукӀащ.	"I accidentally killed you."
КӀалэм лӀыжъым дыгъур ӀэкӀигъэукӀагъ.	ЩӀалэм лӀыжьым дыгъур ӀэщӀигъэукӀащ.	"The boy made the old man accidentally kill the thief."
Сикомпютэр сӀэкӀэкӀосагъ.	Си компьютерыр сӀэщӀэужьыхащ.	"My computer switched off unexpectedly on me."
Пысмэ бэ сӀэкӀэтхагъ.	Письмо куэд сӀэщӀэтхащ.	"I wrote a lot of letters unintentionally."
Сэ мыӀэрысхэр сӀэкӀэшхыхьагъ.	Сэ мыӀэрысэхэр сӀэщӀэшхыхьащ.	"I ate the apples unintentionally."

=== Instrumental (ире- / ре-) ===
Adyghe ре- [raj-] marks the tool/instrument used. Kabardian uses the cognate prefix ире-/ре- alongside the instrumental case suffix -кӀэ.

Verb forms
Adyghe	Kabardian	Meaning
макӀо → рекӀо	мэкӀуэ → ирокӀуэ	"is going" → "is going with/on it"
машхэ → решхэ	мэшхэ → ирешхэ	"is eating" → "is eating with it"

Example sentences
Adyghe	Kabardian	Meaning
Къэлэмым шъуретхэ.	КъэлэмымкӀэ фыретхэ.	"You (pl.) are writing with a pencil."

=== Cislocative (къэ-) ===
The prefix къэ- [qa-] (Kabardian къэ-, identical) primarily marks motion toward the speaker ("hither") and occurs with both dynamic and static verbs. With many dynamic verbs it loses the directional sense and instead adds an aspectual/resultative nuance — making the verb more definite or changing its lexical meaning outright — and it marks arrival. See also Adyghe verbs § Directional prefix.

Verb forms
Adyghe	Kabardian	Meaning
кӀон → къэкӀон	кӀуэн → къэкӀуэн	"to go" → "to come here"
хьын → къэхьын	хьын → къэхьын	"to carry" → "to bring here"
гущыӀэн → къэгущыӀэн	псэлъэн → къэпсэлъэн	"to speak" → "to deliver a speech" (resultative)
къакӀу	къакӀуэ	"come (here)!"

Example sentences
Adyghe	Kabardian	Meaning
МэшӀокур къэсыгъ.	МафӀэгур къэсащ.	"The train has arrived."

=== Translocative (нэ-) ===
Kabardian нэ- [na-] marks motion toward the addressee ("thither", the deictic opposite of къэ-), and the carrying-through of an action to its endpoint. This translocative use is specific to Kabardian; Adyghe has no productive нэ- preverb here (the element survives only in нэсын "to reach"), so the Adyghe column below is empty.

Verb forms
Adyghe	Kabardian	Meaning
—	нэдысын	"to finish sewing"
—	нэджысын	"to finish reading, to read to the end"

Example sentences
Adyghe	Kabardian	Meaning
—	Ар уи деж нэкӀуащ.	"He went to you."

=== Temporal (з-) ===
Adyghe з- [z-], with a tense or conditional suffix, relates an event to the time of another action. Kabardian expresses the corresponding "the time when" with the locative–temporal preverb щы-, shown in the Kabardian column.

Verb forms
Adyghe (з-)	Kabardian (щы-)	Meaning
кӀуагъ → зэкӀом	кӀуащ → щыкӀуам	"when (s)he went"
еплъы → зеплъыкӀэ	еплъ → щеплъкӀэ	"at the time (s)he looks"

Example sentences
Adyghe	Kabardian	Meaning
КӀалэр тучаным зэкӀом силъэгъугъ.	ЩӀалэр тучаным щыкӀуам сыкъилъэгъуащ.	"When the boy went to the shop, he saw me."

=== Manner and factual (зэрэ- … -рэ) ===
The Adyghe circumfix зэрэ- … -рэ [zara- … -rɐ] expresses the way/manner of an action and a factual state ("the fact that…"); with -эу it marks "as soon as". Kabardian uses the cognate зэры- in the same functions.

Verb forms
Adyghe	Kabardian	Meaning
макӀо → зэракӀорэ	мэкӀуэ → зэрыкӀуэр	"walks" → "the way / the fact that (s)he goes"

Example sentences
Adyghe	Kabardian	Meaning
Пшъашъэр зэрэдахэр слъэгъугъ.	Хъыджэбзыр зэрыдахэр слъэгъуащ.	"I saw that the girl is pretty."
КӀалэр псы зэрешъоу скъэсыгъ.	ЩӀалэр псы зэрефэу сыкъэсащ.	"As soon as the boy started drinking, I arrived."

=== Destination (здэ- / зыдэ-) ===
The prefix зыдэ- [zəda-] (Kabardian здэ- [zda-]) marks the destination/location of an action ("where … to"), in relative-clause-like constructions.

Verb forms
Adyghe	Kabardian	Meaning
зыдакӀорэ	здэкӀуэр	"the place (s)he goes to"

Example sentences
Adyghe	Kabardian	Meaning
СыздакӀощтыр сэшӀэ.	СыздэкӀуэнур сощӀэ.	"I know where I am going."
УзыдэщыӀэр къаӀо.	УздэщыӀэр жыӀэ.	"Say where you are."

== Preverbs ==
Both Adyghe and Kabardian possess a large, closed set of positional (locative–directional) preverbs. They express the position or place at/in/on/under/around which an action takes place, and very often also the spatial direction of the verb. The two standards share almost the whole inventory; the prefixes are cognate, differing only by the regular sound correspondences (e.g. Adyghe чӀэ-, шъхьэ-, къо- correspond to Kabardian щӀэ-, щхьэ-, къуэ-).

The following table gives the positional conjugation of two dynamic verbs — "to look" (Adyghe/Kabardian еплъын) and "to throw" (едзын) — showing how the preverb changes the indicated direction of the verb in each dialect.

Position	Dialect	Prefix	"Looking" (еплъын)	"Throwing" (едзын)
Body position / pose	Adyghe	щы- [ɕə]	щеплъэ [ɕajpɬa] "(s)he is looking at that place"	щедзы [ɕajd͡za] "(s)he is throwing at that place"
Body position / pose	Kabardian	щы- [ɕə]	щоплъ [ɕopɬ] "(s)he is looking at that place"	щедз [ɕajd͡z] "(s)he is throwing at that place"
On	Adyghe	те- [taj]	теплъэ [tajpɬa] "(s)he is looking on"	тедзэ [tajd͡za] "(s)he is throwing on/at"
On	Kabardian	те- [taj]	топлъ [topɬ] "(s)he is looking on"	тедз [tajd͡z] "(s)he is throwing on/at"
Under	Adyghe	чӀэ- [ʈ͡ʂʼa]	чӀаплъэ [ʈ͡ʂʼaːpɬa] "(s)he is looking under"	чӀедзэ [ʈ͡ʂʼajd͡za] "(s)he is throwing under"
Under	Kabardian	щӀэ- [ɕʼa]	щӀоплъ [ɕʼopɬ] "(s)he is looking under"	щӀедз [ɕʼajd͡z] "(s)he is throwing under"
Through / within a mass	Adyghe	хэ- [xa]	хаплъэ [xaːpɬa] "(s)he is looking through"	хедзэ [xajd͡za] "(s)he is throwing through"
Through / within a mass	Kabardian	хэ- [xa]	хоплъ [xopɬ] "(s)he is looking through"	хедз [xajd͡z] "(s)he is throwing through"
Within an area / inside an object	Adyghe	дэ- [da]	даплъэ [daːpɬa] "(s)he is looking in an area / inside an object"	дедзэ [dajd͡za] "(s)he is throwing in an area / inside an object"
Within an area / inside an object	Kabardian	дэ- [da]	доплъ [dopɬ] "(s)he is looking in an area / inside an object"	дедз [dajd͡z] "(s)he is throwing in an area / inside an object"
Around	Adyghe	Ӏу- [ʔʷə]	Ӏуаплъэ [ʔʷaːpɬa] "(s)he is looking around"	Ӏуедзэ [ʔʷajd͡za] "(s)he is throwing around"
Around	Kabardian	Ӏу- [ʔʷə]	Ӏуоплъ [ʔʷopɬ] "(s)he is looking around"	Ӏуедз [ʔʷajd͡z] "(s)he is throwing around"
Inside	Adyghe	и- [jə]	еплъэ [japɬa] "(s)he is looking inside"	редзэ [rajd͡za] "(s)he is throwing inside"
Inside	Kabardian	и- [jə]	йоплъ [jopɬ] "(s)he is looking inside"	редз [rajd͡z] "(s)he is throwing inside"
Hanged / attached	Adyghe	пы- [pə]	пэплъэ [papɬa] "(s)he is searching by looking"	педзэ [pajd͡za] "(s)he is hanging by throwing"
Hanged / attached	Kabardian	пы- [pə]	поплъ [popɬ] "(s)he is searching by looking"	педз [pajd͡z] "(s)he is hanging by throwing"
Behind	Adyghe	къо- [qʷa]	къуаплъэ [qʷaːpɬa] "(s)he is looking behind"	къуедзэ [qʷajd͡za] "(s)he is throwing behind"
Behind	Kabardian	къуэ- [qʷa]	къуоплъ [qʷopɬ] "(s)he is looking behind"	къуедз [qʷajd͡z] "(s)he is throwing behind"
Aside	Adyghe	го- [ɡʷa]	гуаплъэ [ɡʷaːpɬa] "(s)he is looking aside"	гуедзэ [ɡʷajd͡za] "(s)he is throwing aside"
Aside	Kabardian	гуэ- [ɡʷa]	гуоплъ [ɡʷopɬ] "(s)he is looking aside"	гуедз [ɡʷajd͡z] "(s)he is throwing aside"
In front of	Adyghe	пэӀу- [paʔʷə]	пэӀуаплъэ [paʔʷaːpɬa] "(s)he is looking in front of"	пэӀуедзэ [paʔʷajd͡za] "(s)he is throwing in front of"
In front of	Kabardian	пэӀу- [paʔʷə]	пэӀуоплъ [paʔʷopɬ] "(s)he is looking in front of"	пэӀуедз [paʔʷajd͡z] "(s)he is throwing in front of"
Backwards	Adyghe	зэкӀ- [zat͡ʃʼ]	зэкӀаплъэ [zat͡ʃʼaːpɬa] "(s)he is looking backwards"	зэкӀедзэ [zat͡ʃʼajd͡za] "(s)he is throwing backwards"
Backwards	Kabardian	зэщӀэ- [zat͡ʃʼa]	зэщӀоплъ [zat͡ʃʼopɬ] "(s)he is looking backwards"	зэщӀедз [zat͡ʃʼajd͡z] "(s)he is throwing backwards"
Inside within	Adyghe	кӀоцӀы- [kʷʼat͡sʼə]	кӀоцӀаплъэ [kʷʼat͡sʼaːpɬa] "(s)he is looking within inside"	кӀоцӀедзэ [kʷʼat͡sʼajd͡za] "(s)he is throwing within inside"
Inside within	Kabardian	кӀуэцӀ- [kʷʼat͡sʼ]	кӀуэцӀоплъ [kʷʼat͡sʼopɬ] "(s)he is looking within inside"	кӀуэцӀедз [kʷʼat͡sʼajd͡z] "(s)he is throwing within inside"
Near	Adyghe	кӀэлъыры- [t͡ʃʼaɬərə]	кӀэлъырыплъэ [t͡ʃʼaɬərəpɬa] "(s)he is looking near"	кӀэлъыредзы [t͡ʃʼaɬərajd͡zə] "(s)he is throwing near"
Near	Kabardian	кӀэлъыры- [t͡ʃʼaɬərə]	кӀэлъыроплъ [t͡ʃʼaɬəropɬ] "(s)he is looking near"	кӀэлъыредз [t͡ʃʼaɬərajd͡z] "(s)he is throwing near"
Toward	Adyghe	лъы- [ɬə]	лъэплъэ [ɬapɬa] "(s)he is looking toward"	лъедзы [ɬajd͡zə] "(s)he is throwing toward"
Toward	Kabardian	лъы- [ɬə]	лъоплъ [ɬopɬ] "(s)he is looking toward"	лъедз [ɬajd͡z] "(s)he is throwing toward"
Past	Adyghe	блэ- [bɮa]	блэплъы [bɮapɬə] "(s)he is looking past"	бледзэ [bɮajd͡za] "(s)he is throwing past"
Past	Kabardian	блэ- [bla]	блоплъ [blopɬ] "(s)he is looking past"	бледз [blajd͡z] "(s)he is throwing past"
Toward the head	Adyghe	шъхьары- [ʂħaːrə]	шъхьарыплъы [ʂħarapɬə] "(s)he is looking at the head"	шъхьаредзы [ʂħarajd͡zə] "(s)he is throwing at the head"
Toward the head	Kabardian	щхьэры- [ɕħarə]	щхьэроплъ [ɕħaropɬ] "(s)he is looking at the head"	щхьэредз [ɕħarajd͡z] "(s)he is throwing at the head"
Over	Adyghe	шъхьадэ- [ʂħaːda]	шъхьэдэплъы [ʂħadapɬə] "(s)he is looking over"	шъхьэдедзы [ʂħadajd͡zə] "(s)he is throwing over"
Over	Kabardian	щхьэдэ- [ɕħada]	щхьэдоплъ [ɕħadopɬ] "(s)he is looking over"	щхьэдедз [ɕħadajd͡z] "(s)he is throwing over"
Over and beyond	Adyghe	шъхьапыры- [ʂħaːpərə]	шъхьапырыплъы [ʂħaːpərəpɬə] "(s)he is looking beyond"	шъхьапыредзы [ʂħaːpərajd͡zə] "(s)he is throwing beyond"
Over and beyond	Kabardian	щхьэпры- [ɕħaprə]	щхьэпроплъ [ɕħapropɬ] "(s)he is looking beyond"	щхьэпредз [ɕħaprajd͡z] "(s)he is throwing beyond"
Directly at (the face)	Adyghe	жэхэ- [ʒaxa]	жэхаплъэ [ʒaxaːpɬa] "(s)he is glaring at one's face"	жэхедзэ [ʒaxajd͡za] "(s)he is throwing at one's face"
Directly at (the face)	Kabardian	жэхэ- [ʒaxa]	жэхоплъ [ʒaxopɬ] "(s)he is glaring at one's face"	жэхедз [ʒaxajd͡z] "(s)he is throwing at one's face"
Directed toward a mouth	Adyghe	жэдэ- [ʒada]	жэдаплъэ [ʒadaːpɬa] "(s)he is looking at a mouth"	жэдедзэ [ʒadajd͡za] "(s)he is throwing at a mouth"
Directed toward a mouth	Kabardian	жэдэ- [ʒada]	жэдоплъ [ʒadopɬ] "(s)he is looking at a mouth"	жэдедз [ʒadajd͡z] "(s)he is throwing at a mouth"

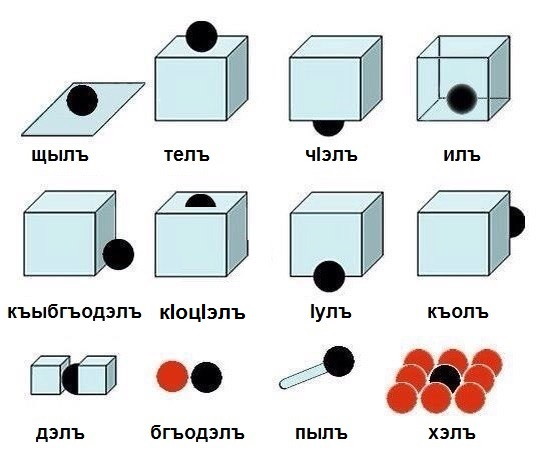
The positional conjugations in Adyghe.

Adyghe:

кӀалэм шхынхэр Ӏанэм телъхьэх
кӀалэ-м шхын-хэ-р Ӏанэ-м те-лъхьэ-х
t͡ʃʼaːɮam ʃxənxar ʔaːnam tajɬħax
boy-ERG food-PL-ABS table-ERG on-put.PRS.3SG
"The boy is putting the foods on the table."

Kabardian:

щӀалэм шхынхэр Ӏэнэм трелъхьэ
щӀалэ-м шхын-хэ-р Ӏэнэ-м т-р-е-лъхьэ
ɕʼaːlam ʃxənxar ʔanam trajɬħa
boy-ERG food-PL-ABS table-OBL on-3SG.ABS-3SG.ERG-put.PRS
"The boy is putting the foods on the table."

Adyghe:

мы гущыӀэм къэлэмкӀэ гуатх
мы гущыӀ-эм къэлэм-кӀэ гуа-тх
mə ɡʷəɕəʔam qalamt͡ʃʼa ɡʷaːtx
DEF word-ERG pencil-INS write besides
"Write besides this word with a pencil."

Kabardian:

мы псалъэм къэлэмкӀэ гуэтх
мы псалъэ-м къэлэм-кӀэ гуэ-тх
mə psaːɬam qalamt͡ʃʼa ɡʷatx
DEF word-OBL pencil-INS write besides
"Write besides this word with a pencil."

In Adyghe, the meanings that many other languages express with prepositions and postpositions are conveyed mainly by preverbs — locative and directional prefixes attached to the verb. The language is exceptionally rich in such preverbs, while having comparatively few postpositions. (Unless otherwise noted, all material and examples in this section follow Rogava & Kerasheva, Grammar of the Adyghe Language, 1966; page numbers in the references are to that book.)

Semantically the preverbs fall into two groups: a more concrete group, in which the preverb still keeps a recognisable connection with a noun denoting a part of an object — for example шъхьэ-, indicating the upper part of an object (cf. шъхьэ "head"), or чӀэ-, indicating that the action takes place under an object (cf. чӀэ "bottom") — and a group of more abstract meaning.

=== Classification ===
By composition, preverbs are either simple — a single element (хэ-, дэ-, шъхьэ-, чӀэ-) — or complex, of two or three elements (шъхьэ-дэ- "crosses over", кӀэ-лъы-ры- "sits beside"). Most locative preverbs occur with both dynamic and static verbs (те-: теплъэ "looks at"), but a few — e.g. блэ-, лъэ-, шъхьэдэ- — combine only with dynamic verbs.

Adding a locative preverb also raises the verb's valency by introducing a new oblique (locative) argument: a monovalent verb becomes bivalent, a bivalent one trivalent, and so on (e.g. ыдзыгъ "(he) threw" → къыптездзагъ "I threw something onto you", къыбгоздзагъ "I threw something beside you"). This behaviour is set out in § Transitivity and positional prefixes below. The directional preverbs къэ- and нэ- stand in front of the locative preverbs, and in transitive verbs the preverb precedes the subject marker.

=== Simple preverbs ===
Simple preverbs consist of a single element. Each has a concrete spatial sense (often traceable to a body-part or object noun) and combines with both static verbs ("stands", "sits", "lies") and dynamic verbs ("goes", "throws", "looks"). The Adyghe forms and examples below follow Rogava & Kerasheva (1966); the cognate Kabardian preverb (regularly differing by sound correspondence) is given with each.

==== Inside (и-) ====
Position or motion inside a hollow, round or bounded object (vessels, regions, an eyelet); used with static and dynamic verbs, the exact reading — staying inside, going in, or coming out — depending on the base verb and any suffixes. In Adyghe transitives и- (йы-) becomes р- before the 3rd-person subject markers и-/а-: истхыгъ "I scratched it" vs. ритхыгъ "he scratched it".

Verb forms
Adyghe	Kabardian	Meaning
ис	исщ	"sits in (it)"
ихьагъ	ихьащ	"went in, entered"
икӀыгъ	икӀащ	"went out of"
рикӀагъ	иракӀащ	"poured (it) in"
рихыгъ	ирихащ	"carried (it) out"
ритхыгъ	иритхащ	"scratched (in it)"
ричыгъ	иричащ	"tore (it) out"

Example sentences
Adyghe	Kabardian	Meaning
Унэм ис.	Унэм исщ.	"(He) sits in the house."
Щэр шхончым илъ.	Шэр фочым илъщ.	"The bullet is in the rifle."
Псыр пхъачаем рикӀагъ.	Псыр пхъэчэным иракӀащ.	"(He) poured the water into the tub."
Пэгуным псыр икӀыгъ.	Пэгуным псыр ижащ.	"Water ran out of the bucket."

==== Within an enclosed area (дэ-) ====
Action in an enclosed or bounded place (a yard, town, garden, pen) or inside an object that can be opened (a chest, cupboard, book); used with static and dynamic verbs. Unlike хэ-/хэ-, the space is conceived as a defined, bounded area rather than a mass one is immersed in. A few nouns, e.g. гу "heart" and пшъэ "neck", waver between дэ- and и-.

Verb forms
Adyghe	Kabardian	Meaning
дэт	дэтщ	"stands in (an enclosure)"
дэс	дэсщ	"sits in, lives in"
дэлъ	дэлъщ	"lies in"
дэкӀы	докӀ	"goes out of"
дэхьагъ	дыхьащ	"went in, entered"
дичыгъ	дричащ	"tore (it) out (from)"

Example sentences
Adyghe	Kabardian	Meaning
Щагум дэт.	ПщӀантӀэм дэтщ.	"(It) is in the yard."
Къалэм дэс.	Къалэм дэсщ.	"(He) lives in the town."
Хатэм дэхьагъ.	Хадэм дыхьащ.	"(He) went into the kitchen garden."

==== In or among a mass (хэ-) ====
Action in or among a mass or medium — a substance (water, milk, sand), an abstract state (joy, grief, sleep), a collective or plural (army, forest, crowd, an organisation), or something soft (a pillow, bedding) — as opposed to и-/и-, which marks containment in a bounded object rather than in a mass.

Verb forms
Adyghe	Kabardian	Meaning
хэт	хэтщ	"is in (a mass)"
хэс	хэсщ	"sits in/among"
хэлъ	хэлъщ	"lies in/among"
хэхьагъ	хыхьащ	"entered, joined"
хидзагъ	хидзащ	"threw (it) in"
хитхыгъ	хитхащ	"pulled (it) out"

Example sentences
Adyghe	Kabardian	Meaning
КӀалэр мэзым хэт.	ЩӀалэр мэзым хэтщ.	"The boy is in the forest."
Хьасан гузэжъогъу хэфагъ.	Хьэсэн гузэвэгъуэ хэхуащ.	"Khasan got into trouble."
Пкъэур хитӀагъ.	Пкъоуэр хитӀащ.	"(He) dug in a stake."

==== On a surface (те-) ====
Action connected with the surface of an object, whatever its shape or size: тет "stands on", телъ "lies on". It can also soften a verb (тецӀэцӀыхьагъ "scolded him a little") or build new stems (тегущыӀагъ "discussed").

Verb forms
Adyghe	Kabardian	Meaning
тет	тетщ	"stands on"
тес	тесщ	"sits on"
телъ	телъщ	"lies on"
техьагъ	техьащ	"stepped onto"
тырихыгъ	трихащ	"took (it) off (the top)"

Example sentences
Adyghe	Kabardian	Meaning
Шхыныр Ӏанэм телъ.	Шхыныр Ӏэнэм телъщ.	"The food is on the table."
Тхьаркъохэр унашъхьэм тебыбыкӀыгъэх.	Тхьэрыкъуэхэр унащхьэм тебыбыкӀахэщ.	"The pigeons flew off the roof."

==== In front of / against (пэ-) ====
From пэ "nose"; basic sense "in front (of)", also "against" in a literal or figurative sense; used with static and dynamic verbs.

Verb forms
Adyghe	Kabardian	Meaning
пэт	пэтщ	"stands in front of"
пэс	пэсщ	"sits opposite / at"
пэлъ	пэлъщ	"lies opposite; guards"
пэуцун	пэувын	"to stand in front of"
пэдзыжьын	пэдзыжын	"to throw back"

Example sentences
Adyghe	Kabardian	Meaning
МашӀом пэт.	МафӀэм пэтщ.	"(He) stands in front of the fire."
Ӏанэм пэс.	Ӏэнэм пэсщ.	"(He) sits at the table."
Пиеу пэтэджыгъ.	Бииуэ пэуващ.	"(He) stood up as an opponent (against)."

==== On the tip or end (пы-) ====
Action connected with the end, tip or front part of an object — attaching to it (пидагъ "sewed on") or detaching from it (пиупкӀыгъ "cut off the end").

Verb forms
Adyghe	Kabardian	Meaning
пыт	пытщ	"is on the tip/end"
пылъ	пылъщ	"hangs on (the end)"
пыс	пысщ	"sits on the end"
пихыгъ	пихащ	"took (it) off (the end)"
пичыгъ	пичащ	"tore (it) off"
пилъагъ	пилъащ	"hung (it) up"

Example sentences
Adyghe	Kabardian	Meaning
МыӀэрысэхэр пыт.	МыӀэрысэхэр пытщ.	"The apples are on the tree (on the tip)."
КӀакӀор дэпкъым пилъагъ.	КӀакӀуэр блыным пилъащ.	"(He) hung the suit on the wall."
Ӏудэнэ цыпэр пичыгъ.	Ӏуданэ цыпэр пичащ.	"(He) tore off the end of the thread."

==== Under (чӀэ- / щӀэ-) ====
From чӀэ "bottom"; basic sense "under", and by extension "inside a building or institution" (under its roof). Adyghe чӀ corresponds to Kabardian щӀ.

Verb forms
Adyghe	Kabardian	Meaning
чӀэт	щӀэтщ	"stands under"
чӀэс	щӀэсщ	"sits under"
чӀэлъ	щӀэлъщ	"lies under"
чӀэхьагъ	щӀыхьащ	"went in under, entered"
чӀихыгъ	щӀихащ	"carried (it) out from under"
чӀитӀагъ	щӀитӀащ	"buried (it)"

Example sentences
Adyghe	Kabardian	Meaning
Ахэр чъыг чӀэгъым чӀэсых.	Ахэр жыг щӀагъым щӀэсхэщ.	"They are sitting under the tree."
Шыхэр шэщым чӀищагъэх.	Шыхэр шэщым щӀишащ.	"(He) led the horses into the stable."
Пэшым чӀэхьагъ.	Пэшым щӀыхьащ.	"(He) went into the room."

==== Below / under (кӀэ-) ====
Close to чӀэ-; basic sense "from below, below, under". It can also mark purpose or cause (кӀэдао "fights for", кӀэупчӀагъэх "inquired after") and, with кӀы-/жьы-, repetition (кӀетхыкӀыжьы "rewrites").

Verb forms
Adyghe	Kabardian	Meaning
кӀэт	кӀэтщ	"is under, present"
кӀэс	кӀэсщ	"sits below"
кӀэлъ	кӀэлъщ	"lies below"
кӀэтхагъ	кӀэтхащ	"signed (at the foot)"
кӀихыгъ	кӀихащ	"took (it) from below"

Example sentences
Adyghe	Kabardian	Meaning
Ар письмэм кӀэтхэжьыгъ.	Ар письмэм кӀэтхэжащ.	"He signed at the foot of the letter."
Сымаджэм къыкӀэупчӀагъэх.	Сымаджэм къыкӀэупщӀахэщ.	"They inquired after the sick man."
Жыг лъапсэм кӀэтхъун.	Жыг лъабжьэм кӀэщӀэтхъуэн.	"to rake up under the tree"

==== At the side (го- / гу(э)-) ====
Action "at/from the side, next to": гос "sits beside", гокӀы "moves away from the side".

Verb forms
Adyghe	Kabardian	Meaning
гос	гуэсщ	"sits beside"
гокӀы	гуокӀ	"moves away from the side"
гопхагъ	гуэпхащ	"tied (it) to the side"
гуихыгъ	гуихащ	"took (a bit) from the side"
гуицыгъ	гуищащ	"led (it) away from the side"

Example sentences
Adyghe	Kabardian	Meaning
Гъунэгъум гос.	Гъунэгъум гуэсщ.	"(He) sits next to the neighbour."
ШитӀум языр гуицыгъ.	ШитӀым языр гуищащ.	"(He) led one of the two horses away from the side."

==== The lateral side (бгъу- / бгъуры-) ====
Close in function to го- but referring to the lateral side of something; comparatively rare.

Verb forms
Adyghe	Kabardian	Meaning
бгъут	бгъурытщ	"stands beside"
ебгъукӀо	бгъурокӀ	"passes by the side"
бгъурылъхьан	бгъурылъхьэн	"to lay beside"
ебгъучӀагъ	бгъурыхьащ	"ran up to (from the side)"

Example sentences
Adyghe	Kabardian	Meaning
Аслъан ащ ебгъучӀагъ.	Аслъэн абы бгъурыхьащ.	"Aslan ran up to him (from the side)."

==== At the mouth, edge or near (Ӏу-) ====
From Ӏу "mouth"; literally of the mouth/lips, and by transfer "bank, shore", "front, façade", "entrance", "edge", "at, near".

Verb forms
Adyghe	Kabardian	Meaning
Ӏут	Ӏутщ	"stands by/near"
Ӏус	Ӏусщ	"sits by/near"
Ӏулъ	Ӏулъщ	"lies by/near"
Ӏуихыгъ	Ӏуихащ	"moved (it) aside"
Ӏуичыгъ	Ӏуичащ	"pulled (it) out"

Example sentences
Adyghe	Kabardian	Meaning
Хьэр пчъэм Ӏулъ.	Хьэр бжэм Ӏулъщ.	"The dog lies by the door."
Ыцэ Ӏуичыгъ.	И дзэ Ӏуичащ.	"(He) pulled out a tooth."
Пчъэр Ӏуихыгъ.	Бжэр Ӏуихащ.	"(He) pushed the door aside."

==== In the corner / behind (къо- / къуэ-) ====
From къогъу "corner"; "in the corner" and, by transfer, "behind / in the space behind something". The sunrise idiom uses it: тыгъэр къыкъокӀы "the sun rises (comes from behind the horizon)".

Verb forms
Adyghe	Kabardian	Meaning
къот	къуэтщ	"stands in the corner / behind"
къос	къуэсщ	"sits in the corner / behind"
къолъ	къуэлъщ	"lies in the corner / behind"
къыкъокӀы	къыкъуокӀ	"comes out from behind"

Example sentences
Adyghe	Kabardian	Meaning
Пхъэр хьаку къогъум къолъ.	Пхъэр хьэку къуэм къуэлъщ.	"The firewood lies behind the stove."
Пчъэдыжьым тыгъэр къыкъокӀы.	Пщэдджыжьым дыгъэр къыкъуокӀ.	"In the morning the sun rises (from behind the horizon)."
Тыгъэр бгым къыкъокӀыгъ.	Дыгъэр бгым къыкъуэкӀащ.	"The sun rose from behind the mountain."

==== Inside, within (кӀоцӀы- / кӀуэцӀы-) ====
From кӀоцӀы "inside, within it"; "inward, from within, into the inside of something" — often "to wrap in".

Verb forms
Adyghe	Kabardian	Meaning
кӀоцӀылъ	кӀуэцӀылъщ	"lies inside"
кӀоцӀылъхьагъ	кӀуэцӀылъхьащ	"put/wrapped (it) inside"
кӀоцӀышъугъ	кӀуэцӀышащ	"sucked (it) out from inside"

Example sentences
Adyghe	Kabardian	Meaning
Дэн купкӀ кӀоцӀылъ.	Дэм и купкӀ кӀуэцӀылъщ.	"Inside the nut lies the kernel."
ШэкӀэр тхылъымпӀэм кӀоцӀыщыхьагъ.	ШэкӀыр тхылъымпӀэм кӀуэцӀихьащ.	"(He) wrapped the material in paper."
Сабийр шхыӀэным кӀоцӀилъхьагъ.	Сабийр шхыӀэным кӀуэцӀилъхьащ.	"(He) wrapped the child in a blanket."

==== After / in pursuit (лъэ-, лъы- / кӀэлъ-, лъ) ====
From лъэ "foot, leg"; "after, in pursuit of", used only with dynamic verbs; лъы- can also express the purpose of an action. Kabardian uses кӀэлъ- in this sense.

Verb forms
Adyghe	Kabardian	Meaning
лъыплъагъ	кӀэлъыплъащ	"looked after (someone)"
лъычъагъ	кӀэлъыжащ	"ran after"
лъыджагъ	кӀэлъыджащ	"shouted after"
лъидзыгъ	кӀэлъидзащ	"threw (it) after"

Example sentences
Adyghe	Kabardian	Meaning
Чыжьэ лэныстэр лъэдзыгъ.	Жыжьэ лэныстэр кӀэлъидзащ.	"(He) threw the scissors after him."
Мыщэм лъыкӀон.	Мыщэм кӀэлъыкӀуэн.	"to go after the bear"

==== Past (блэ-) ====
"Past, further on"; used only with dynamic verbs.

Verb forms
Adyghe	Kabardian	Meaning
блэкӀы	блокӀ	"passes by"
блэплъы	блоплъ	"looks past"
бледзы	бледз	"throws (it) past"
блэчъы	блож	"flows / runs past"

Example sentences
Adyghe	Kabardian	Meaning
Псыр блэчъы.	Псыр блож.	"The river flows past."
Унэм блэчъыгъ.	Унэм блэжащ.	"(He) ran past the house."

==== On the point or end; malefactive (шӀо- / фӀэ-) ====
Action connected with the end or point of something (шӀот "is on it"). Adyghe шӀ corresponds to Kabardian фӀ; the Kabardian cognate фӀэ- carries both the locative sense and an adversative/malefactive one ("to another's detriment"), treated under the malefactive prefix фӀэ- above.

Verb forms
Adyghe	Kabardian	Meaning
шӀот	фӀэтщ	"is on the point/end"
шӀолъ	фӀэлъщ	"is mounted on (the end)"
шӀодзагъ	фӀэдзащ	"hung (it) on"
шӀозыгъ	фӀэзащ	"came off (the end)"

Example sentences
Adyghe	Kabardian	Meaning
Лыр лыкъум шӀолъагъ.	Лыр лыкъуэм фӀэлъащ.	"The meat is hung on the hook."

==== Connected with the hand (Ӏы- / Ӏэ-) ====
Action connected with the hand; in Adyghe it usually co-occurs with зэ- (зэӀытхыгъ "came apart"). Kabardian has the cognate hand-preverb Ӏэ-/Ӏы-, on which the involuntative ӀэщӀэ- (Adyghe ӀэкӀэ-) is built (see the involuntative prefix above).

Verb forms
Adyghe	Kabardian	Meaning
зэӀытхыгъ	зэӀотхыкӀ	"came apart (in the hands)"
зэӀишӀагъ	зэӀищӀащ	"hindered, got in the way"

Example sentences
Adyghe	Kabardian	Meaning
Матэхэр къыӀихыжьыгъ.	Матэхэр къыӀихыжащ.	"(She) took the baskets out of her hands."

=== Complex preverbs ===
Complex preverbs are built either from two simple preverbs or from a preverb plus the formant -ры- (which marks the oblique object through, toward or from which the action passes). Several are little used or restricted to dynamic verbs. The book records Kabardian cognates for several of them — жьэхэ-, бгъэдэ-, щхьэщы-, пхыры-, кӀуэцӀыры- and щхьэпыры-.

Preverb	Composition and meaning	Example
пэӀу-	пэ- + Ӏу-; "opposite, facing"	пэӀут "stands opposite"
пэшӀо-	пэ- + шӀо-; "toward, over or beyond an object"	пэшӀокӀыгъ "passed; is behind"
пэкӀэ-	пэ- + кӀэ-; the space below and in front (dynamic only)	апэ пэкӀэуцонэу "to be the first to take a blow"
кӀэкӀэ-	кӀэ "tail" + кӀэ-; "imperceptibly, unnoticed"	кӀэкӀахыгъ "took from him unnoticed"
кӀэлъы- (Kbd кӀэлъ-)	кӀэ- + лъы-; "after, in the wake of"	къыскӀэлъыплъагъ "he gazed after me"
кӀэбгъу-	кӀэ- + бгъу-; movement to the side (rare)	Шыр кӀэбгъулъыгъ "the horse shied to the side"
ӀэкӀэ-	Ӏэ "hand" + кӀэ; action with the hand	Сэнэфыбжъэр къыӀэкӀэзы "the glass falls from his hands"
Ӏэпэ-	Ӏэ "hand" + пэ "tip"; action with the fingers	Дышъэр Ӏэпытэкъуи "the gold fell from her hands"
лъэхэ-	лъэ- + хэ-; location at or approach to	лъэхэт "is in (someone's) service"
лъыкӀэ-	лъы- + кӀэ-; "after, overtaking" (dynamic only)	лъыкӀэхъагъ "(he) overtook him"
жэдэ-	жэ "mouth" + дэ-; correlated with the mouth	Жэдилъхьагъ "(he) put it in his mouth"
жэхэ- (Kbd жьэхэ-)	жэ "mouth" + хэ-; toward the front/face of	Пшъашъэм жэхэплъагъ "(he) looked at the girl"
бгъодэ- (Kbd бгъэдэ-)	бгъо- + дэ-; "beside, near"	шым бгъодэкӀыщтыгъэп "did not leave the horse's side"
шӀохэ-	шӀо- + хэ-; ≈ simple шӀо-	ишхонч къышӀохилъхьи "slung on his rifle"
шъхьэдэ- (Kbd щхьэдэ-)	шъхьэ- + дэ-; overcoming an obstacle (dynamic only)	чэумэ къашъхьэдэкӀызэ "climbing over the fences"
шъхьэщы- (Kbd щхьэщы-)	шъхьэ "head" + щы-; "above, on top, over"	ПӀэло шъхьэщыс "a hat sits on his head"

The -ры- group, with Kabardian counterparts where attested:

Preverb	Composition and meaning	Example
пхыры- (Kbd пхыры-)	пхы- + -ры-; "through, across" (dynamic only)	пхырыкӀырэп "does not pass through (the walls)"
кӀоцӀыры- (Kbd кӀуэцӀыры-)	кӀоцӀы- + -ры-; "inside, through"	Мэзым кӀоцӀырыкӀыгъэх "(they) passed through the forest"
кӀэлъыры-	кӀэ-лъы- + -ры-; "after" (dialectal variant of кӀэлъы-)	Дэпкъым кӀэлъырыуцуагъ "(he) stood by the wall"
шъхьэры- (Kbd щхьэры-)	шъхьэ- + -ры-; "from above, over something"	башнехэр лъагэу шъхьэрыт "the towers stand high above"
шъхьэпыры- (Kbd щхьэпыры-)	шъхьэ-пы- + -ры-; "over, across" (dynamic only)	къуаджэхэм шъхьэпырыбыбылъхэу "flying over the villages"
пэкӀэры-	пэ-кӀэ- + -ры-; movement to meet (dynamic only)	пэкӀэрыуагъ "struck from the front"
гуры-	гу "heart" + -ры-; with the centre/heart (rare)	гурэӀо "(he) understands"
пкъыры-	пкъы "body" + -ры-; with the organism as a whole	Кухэжъыр зэпкъырылъэлъыгъ "the old cart fell apart"

=== Locative (щы- / щ(ы)-) ===
The preverb щы- marks the place of an action, independent of the object's shape, in both static and dynamic verbs; with a time noun it marks the span over which the action took place. It stands before all other preverbs except the directional one. Unlike Kabardian щы-, Adyghe щы- does not express condition in finite verbs; temporal "when" is instead carried by зы- or з(ы)-щы-.

Verb forms
Adyghe	Kabardian	Meaning
щыс	щысщ	"sits (in a place)"
щылъ	щылъщ	"lies (in a place)"
щэлажьэ	щолажьэ	"works (in a place)"

Example sentences
Adyghe	Kabardian	Meaning
Адрэ унэм уятэ щэчъые.	Адрей унэм уи адэ щожей.	"Your father is sleeping in the other room."
Сэ мыбы сыщеджагъ.	Сэ мыбы сыщеджащ.	"I studied here."
Ар къалэм щыпсэугъ.	Ар къалэм щыпсэуащ.	"He lived in the city."

=== Preverbs and postpositions ===
Preverbs and postpositions share a common origin, and many preverbs still coincide with a postposition of the same form and meaning (e.g. кӀоцӀы- "inside", бгъу- "side", чӀэгъ "underneath", къогъу- "corner, behind"). The same content can often be expressed either way — compare the preverb in Псы чӀэгъым чӀэӀодагъ with the postposition in Псым чӀэгъым чӀэӀодагъ, both "disappeared under the water". Adyghe is rich in preverbs but has few postpositions, so the work done elsewhere by prepositions and postpositions falls largely to the preverbs.

=== Other directional preverbs ===
A few directional preverbs fall outside the locative paradigm above.

==== Across / over a low obstacle (пыры-) ====
Action carried over a low object (e.g. looking over a fence), or across an obstacle such as a river or a bridge.

Verb forms
Adyghe	Kabardian	Meaning
зэпырыкӀын	зэпырыкӀын	"to cross over"
пырыплъын	пырыплъын	"to look over (a fence)"
зэпырышын	пырышын (зэпырышын)	"to take/lead across (a river, a bridge)"

==== Backwards (зэщӀэ- / зэкӀ-) ====
Action directed backwards or behind the subject.

Verb forms
Adyghe	Kabardian	Meaning
макӀо → зэкӀакӀо	мэкӀуэ → зэщӀокӀуэ	"is going" → "is going backwards"
едзы → зэкӀедзы	едз → зэщӀедз	"throws" → "throws backwards"
зэкӀэплъэн	зэщӀэплъэн	"to look backwards"

Example sentences
Adyghe	Kabardian	Meaning
Нахьыеу тӀэкӀу зэкӀакӀу.	Нэхъ тӀэкӀу зэщӀыкӀуэ.	"Move backward a bit more."

==== Spread in different directions (зэбгры- / зэбгыры-) ====
The spread of an action in different directions.

Verb forms
Adyghe	Kabardian	Meaning
зэбгырыдзын	зэбгрыдзын	"to scatter (by throwing)"
зэбгырыкӀын	зэбгрыкӀын	"to disperse (in different directions)"
зэбгырыхын	зэбгрыхын	"to take apart, separate"

=== Additional Kabardian preverbs (book-attested) ===
Jaimoukha's grammar of Kabardian lists several further positional/directional preverbs that are not given a separate subsection above; they are recorded here for completeness, with an Adyghe cognate where one is clear.

Preverbs
Adyghe	Kabardian	Meaning
кӀэры-	кӀэры-	"on a vertical surface; adhering to; (separation) away from"
жэдэ-	жьэдэ-	"in / into the mouth"
пэгъо-	пе-	"moving to meet, coming half-way toward"
ире-	ири-	"motion along a surface"
регъэ-	ирегъа-	"causative ('send, let, make do')"
—	зэт-, зэхэ-	"totality of the action (done all over / completely)"

Example sentences (Kabardian)
Adyghe	Kabardian	Meaning
—	Блыным лозунг кӀэрытхэн.	"To write a slogan on the wall."
—	Фызым пежьэн.	"To go to meet the woman."
—	Лъагъуэм ирикӀуэн.	"To follow (go along) the path."
—	Думэсарэ хьэщӀэхэм шейр ирегъафэ.	"Dumasara offers the guests tea (makes them drink)."

=== Transitivity and positional prefixes ===
Adding a positional prefix to a verb often alters its valency by introducing a new spatial or locative argument. This new argument is always placed in the oblique case (marked by -м). The behaviour of the verb and its arguments changes depending on its original transitivity. The principle is identical in both standards; only the example forms differ.

==== Monovalent intransitive verbs ====
When a positional prefix is attached to a monovalent intransitive verb, it adds a new valency. Because such verbs have no oblique-case argument by default, the new argument serves as the locative target, effectively turning the verb into a bivalent intransitive. Note how the default dynamic 3rd-person prefix (мэ-/ма-) drops when the positional prefix is introduced.

Adyghe:

Sentence	Word breakdown	Gloss	Function	Translation
Ар мэплъэ.	ар мэ-плъэ	He 3SG.ABS-look	S VERB	"He is looking."
Ар ащ теплъэ.	ар ащ ø-те-плъэ	He that 3SG.ABS-on-look	S IO VERB	"He is looking on/at that."
КӀалэр мэгущыӀэ.	кӀалэ-р мэ-гущыӀэ	boy-ABS 3SG.ABS-speak	S VERB	"The boy is speaking."
КӀалэр пшъашъэм тегущыӀэ.	кӀалэ-р пшъашъэ-м ø-те-гущыӀэ	boy-ABS girl-OBL 3SG.ABS-on-speak	S IO VERB	"The boy is speaking about the girl."
КӀалэр матхэ.	кӀалэ-р ма-тхэ	boy-ABS 3SG.ABS-write	S VERB	"The boy is writing."
КӀалэр Ӏанэм тетхэ.	кӀалэ-р Ӏанэ-м ø-те-тхэ	boy-ABS table-OBL 3SG.ABS-on-write	S IO VERB	"The boy is writing on the table."
Сэ о сыптегущыӀэ.	сэ о сы-п-те-гущыӀэ	I you 1SG.ABS-2SG.OBL-on-speak	S IO VERB	"I talk about you."
О сэ укъыстегущыӀэ.	о сэ у-къы-с-те-гущыӀэ	You me 2SG.ABS-DIR-1SG.OBL-on-speak	S IO VERB	"You talk about me."
О оплъэ.	о о-плъэ	You 2SG.ABS-look	S VERB	"You look."
О сэ укъысэплъэ.	о сэ у-къы-с-э-плъэ	You me 2SG.ABS-DIR-1SG.OBL-DAT-look	S IO VERB	"You look at me."
О сэ укъыстеплъэ.	о сэ у-къы-с-те-плъэ	You me 2SG.ABS-DIR-1SG.OBL-on-look	S IO VERB	"You look on/at me."
Сэ о скъыптеплъэ.	сэ о с-къы-п-те-плъэ	I you 1SG.ABS-DIR-2SG.OBL-on-look	S IO VERB	"I look on/at you."

Kabardian:

Sentence	Word breakdown	Gloss	Function	Translation
Ар маплъэ.	ар ма-плъэ	He 3SG.ABS-look	S VERB	"He is looking."
Ар абы топлъ.	ар абы ø-т-о-плъ	He that 3SG.ABS-on-look	S IO VERB	"He is looking on/at that."
ЩӀалэр мэпсалъэ.	щӀалэ-р мэ-псалъэ	boy-ABS 3SG.ABS-speak	S VERB	"The boy is speaking."
ЩӀалэр пщащэм топсэлъыхь.	щӀалэ-р пщащэ-м ø-т-о-псэлъыхь	boy-ABS girl-OBL 3SG.ABS-on-speak	S IO VERB	"The boy is speaking about the girl."
ЩӀалэр матхэ.	щӀалэ-р ма-тхэ	boy-ABS 3SG.ABS-write	S VERB	"The boy is writing."
ЩӀалэр Ӏэнэм тетхэ.	щӀалэ-р Ӏэнэ-м ø-те-тхэ	boy-ABS table-OBL 3SG.ABS-on-write	S IO VERB	"The boy is writing on the table."
Сэ уэ сыптопсэлъыхь.	сэ уэ сы-п-т-о-псэлъыхь	I you 1SG.ABS-2SG.OBL-on-speak	S IO VERB	"I talk about you."
Уэ сэ укъыстопсэлъыхь.	уэ сэ у-къы-с-т-о-псэлъыхь	You me 2SG.ABS-DIR-1SG.OBL-on-speak	S IO VERB	"You talk about me."
Уэ уаплъэ.	уэ у-а-плъэ	You 2SG.ABS-look	S VERB	"You look."
Уэ сэ укъызоплъ.	уэ сэ у-къы-з-о-плъ	You me 2SG.ABS-DIR-1SG.OBL-DAT-look	S IO VERB	"You look at me."
Уэ сэ укъыстоплъ.	уэ сэ у-къы-с-т-о-плъ	You me 2SG.ABS-DIR-1SG.OBL-on-look	S IO VERB	"You look on/at me."
Сэ уэ сыптоплъ.	сэ уэ сы-п-т-о-плъ	I you 1SG.ABS-2SG.OBL-on-look	S IO VERB	"I look on/at you."

==== Bivalent intransitive verbs ====
Bivalent intransitive verbs cannot simply take a new positional preverb, because they already have an argument in the oblique case behaving as a dative/target. Instead, the positional prefix replaces the standard directional prefix, shifting the existing oblique noun/pronoun from a general dative target to a specific locative one.

Adyghe:

Sentence	Word breakdown	Gloss	Function	Translation
КӀалэр пшынэм ео.	кӀалэ-р пшынэ-м ø-е-о	boy-ABS accordion-OBL 3SG.ABS-DAT-hit	S IO VERB	"The boy hits the accordion."
КӀалэр пшынэм тео.	кӀалэ-р пшынэ-м ø-те-о	boy-ABS accordion-OBL 3SG.ABS-on-hit	S IO VERB	"The boy hits on the accordion."
Сэ сэо.	сэ с-э-о	I 1SG.ABS-DAT-hit	S VERB	"I hit."
Сэ о сыкъыоо.	сэ о сы-къы-о-о	I you 1SG.ABS-DIR-2SG.OBL-hit	S IO VERB	"I hit you."
Сэ о сыптео.	сэ о сы-п-те-о	I you 1SG.ABS-2SG.OBL-on-hit	S IO VERB	"I hit on you."

Kabardian:

Sentence	Word breakdown	Gloss	Function	Translation
ЩӀалэр пшынэм йоуэ.	щӀалэ-р пшынэ-м ø-й-о-уэ	boy-ABS accordion-OBL 3SG.ABS-DAT-hit	S IO VERB	"The boy hits the accordion."
ЩӀалэр пшынэм тоуэ.	щӀалэ-р пшынэ-м ø-т-о-уэ	boy-ABS accordion-OBL 3SG.ABS-on-hit	S IO VERB	"The boy hits on the accordion."
Сэ соуэ.	сэ с-о-уэ	I 1SG.ABS-DAT-hit	S VERB	"I hit."
Сэ уэ сыноуэ.	сэ уэ сы-н-о-уэ	I you 1SG.ABS-2SG.OBL-hit	S IO VERB	"I hit you."
Сэ уэ сыптоуэ.	сэ уэ сы-п-т-о-уэ	I you 1SG.ABS-2SG.OBL-on-hit	S IO VERB	"I hit on you."

==== Bivalent transitive verbs ====
Standard bivalent transitive verbs have an ergative subject and an absolutive direct object, but no oblique role. Adding a positional prefix introduces a new locative argument in the oblique case, turning the verb into a trivalent transitive. Note how the positional prefix stacks with the ergative marker.

Adyghe:

Sentence	Word breakdown	Gloss	Function	Translation
КӀалэм мыжъор едзы.	кӀалэ-м мыжъо-р ø-е-дзы	boy-ERG stone-ABS 3SG.ABS-3SG.ERG-throw	A O VERB	"The boy throws the stone."
КӀалэм мыжъор хым хедзэ.	кӀалэ-м мыжъо-р хы-м ø-х-е-дзэ	boy-ERG stone-ABS sea-OBL 3SG.ABS-in-3SG.ERG-throw	A O IO VERB	"The boy throws the stone into the sea."
КӀалэм гущыӀэр етхы.	кӀалэ-м гущыӀэ-р ø-е-тхы	boy-ERG word-ABS 3SG.ABS-3SG.ERG-write	A O VERB	"The boy writes the word."
КӀалэм гущыӀэр Ӏанэм тетхы.	кӀалэ-м гущыӀэ-р Ӏанэ-м ø-те-т-хы	boy-ERG word-ABS table-OBL 3SG.ABS-on-3SG.ERG-write	A O IO VERB	"The boy writes the word on the table."
КӀалэм пшъашъэр елъэгъу.	кӀалэ-м пшъашъэ-р ø-е-лъэгъу	boy-ERG girl-ABS 3SG.ABS-3SG.ERG-see	A O VERB	"The boy sees the girl."
КӀалэм пшъашъэр чъыгым чӀелъагъо.	кӀалэ-м пшъашъэ-р чъыгы-м ø-чӀ-е-лъагъо	boy-ERG girl-ABS tree-OBL 3SG.ABS-under-3SG.ERG-see	A O IO VERB	"The boy sees the girl under the tree."
Сэ о осэлъэгъу.	сэ о о-с-э-лъэгъу	I you 2SG.ABS-1SG.ERG-PRS-see	A O VERB	"I see you."
Сэ о унашъхьэм утесэлъэгъу.	сэ о у-нашъхьэ-м у-те-с-э-лъэгъу	I you 2SG-head-OBL 2SG.ABS-on-1SG.ERG-PRS-see	A O IO VERB	"I see you on your head."
О сэ унашъхьэм стеолъэгъу.	о сэ у-нашъхьэ-м с-те-о-лъэгъу	You me 2SG-head-OBL 1SG.ABS-on-2SG.ERG-see	A O IO VERB	"You see me on your head."

Kabardian:

Sentence	Word breakdown	Gloss	Function	Translation
ЩӀалэм мывэр едз.	щӀалэ-м мывэ-р ø-е-дз	boy-ERG stone-ABS 3SG.ABS-3SG.ERG-throw	A O VERB	"The boy throws the stone."
ЩӀалэм мывэр хым хедз.	щӀалэ-м мывэ-р хы-м ø-х-е-дз	boy-ERG stone-ABS sea-OBL 3SG.ABS-in-3SG.ERG-throw	A O IO VERB	"The boy throws the stone into the sea."
ЩӀалэм псалъэр етх.	щӀалэ-м псалъэ-р ø-е-тх	boy-ERG word-ABS 3SG.ABS-3SG.ERG-write	A O VERB	"The boy writes the word."
ЩӀалэм псалъэр Ӏэнэм третх.	щӀалэ-м псалъэ-р Ӏэнэ-м ø-т-р-е-тх	boy-ERG word-ABS table-OBL 3SG.ABS-on-3SG.ERG-write	A O IO VERB	"The boy writes the word on the table."
ЩӀалэм пщащэр елъагъу.	щӀалэ-м пщащэ-р ø-е-лъагъу	boy-ERG girl-ABS 3SG.ABS-3SG.ERG-see	A O VERB	"The boy sees the girl."
ЩӀалэм пщащэр жыгым щӀелъагъу.	щӀалэ-м пщащэ-р жыгы-м ø-щӀ-е-лъагъу	boy-ERG girl-ABS tree-OBL 3SG.ABS-under-3SG.ERG-see	A O IO VERB	"The boy sees the girl under the tree."
Сэ уэ узолъагъу.	сэ уэ у-з-о-лъагъу	I you 2SG.ABS-1SG.ERG-PRS-see	A O VERB	"I see you."
Сэ уэ унащхьэм утызолъагъу.	сэ уэ унэ-щхьэ-м у-т-ы-з-о-лъагъу	I you house-head-OBL 2SG.ABS-on-DIR-1SG.ERG-PRS-see	A O IO VERB	"I see you on the roof."
Уэ сэ унащхьэм сыптолъагъу.	уэ сэ унэ-щхьэ-м сы-п-т-о-лъагъу	You me house-head-OBL 1SG.ABS-on-2SG.ERG-see	A O IO VERB	"You see me on the roof."

==== Trivalent transitive verbs ====
Trivalent transitive verbs (also called ditransitive verbs) cannot take a positional prefix. These verbs inherently require three arguments (Agent, Theme and Recipient/Goal), so their oblique-case slot is already occupied; adding a locative positional prefix would conflict with the existing indirect-object argument structure.

=== Positional verbs ===
In both standards, certain verb roots denote a general sense of motion — such as entering, exiting, removing or falling — but cannot occur on their own. They inherently require a positional prefix to specify the spatial nature of the action. The matrices below show how these bound motion roots combine with the common positional prefixes "on", "under", "inside" and "within a mass/liquid".

Note: for the transitive roots, the 3rd-person singular ergative marker -е- stacks and merges with the positional prefix (e.g. Adyghe чӀэ + е + хы + н → чӀехын; Kabardian щӀэ + е + хы + н → щӀехын).

Adyghe:

Root	Action	те- (on)	чӀэ- (under)	и- (inside)	хэ- (within mass)
-хьан	to enter / step into	техьан "to step on"	чӀэхьан "to step under"	ихьан "to enter (inside)"	хэхьан "to enter (water/crowd)"
-кӀын	to exit / go off	текӀын "to get off"	чӀэкӀын "to exit from under"	икӀын "to exit (inside)"	хэкӀын "to exit (water/crowd)"
-хын (tr.)	to take off / remove	техын "to take off (from top)"	чӀехын "to take out from under"	ихын "to take out from inside"	хехын "to take out of (a mass)"
-фын (tr.)	to drive off / chase	тефын "to drive off (the top)"	чӀефын "to drive from under"	ифын "to drive out of (inside)"	хефын "to drive out of (a mass)"
-зын	to drop / fall off	тезын "to drop off (the top)"	чӀэзын "to drop from under"	изын "to drop out of (inside)"	хэзын "to drop out of (a mass)"
-лъэдэн	to run into	телъэдэн "to run onto"	чӀэлъэдэн "to run under"	илъэдэн "to run into (inside)"	хэлъэдэн "to run into (a mass)"
-шъутын	to exit running	тешъутын "to run off (the top)"	чӀэшъутын "to run out from under"	ишъутын "to run out of (inside)"	хэшъутын "to run out of (a mass)"
-фэн	to fall	тефэн "to fall on"	чӀэфэн "to fall under"	ифэн "to fall inside"	хэфэн "to fall into (a mass)"

Kabardian:

Root	Action	те- (on)	щӀэ- (under)	и- (inside)	хэ- (within mass)
-хьэн	to enter / step into	техьэн "to step on"	щӀэхьэн "to step under"	ихьэн "to enter (inside)"	хэхьэн "to enter (water/crowd)"
-кӀын	to exit / go off	текӀын "to get off"	щӀэкӀын "to exit from under"	икӀын "to exit (inside)"	хэкӀын "to exit (water/crowd)"
-хын (tr.)	to take off / remove	техын "to take off (from top)"	щӀехын "to take out from under"	ихын "to take out from inside"	хехын "to take out of (a mass)"
-хун (tr.)	to drive off / chase	техун "to drive off (the top)"	щӀехун "to drive from under"	ихун "to drive out of (inside)"	хехун "to drive out of (a mass)"
-дзын (tr.)	to drop / throw	тедзын "to drop onto (the top)"	щӀэдзын "to throw under"	идзын "to drop inside"	хэдзын "to throw into (a mass)"
-лъэдэн	to run into	телъэдэн "to run onto"	щӀэлъэдэн "to run under"	илъэдэн "to run into (inside)"	хэлъэдэн "to run into (a mass)"
-жэн	to run	тежэн "to run on (the top)"	щӀэжэн "to run under"	ижэн "to run inside"	хэжэн "to run in (a mass)"
-хуэн	to fall	техуэн "to fall on"	щӀэхуэн "to fall under"	ихуэн "to fall inside"	хэхуэн "to fall into (a mass)"

=== Positional conjugation of static verbs ===
The same positional prefixes combine with the steady-state verbs "to stand", "to sit" and "to lie", giving the position in which something is located.

Position	Dialect	Prefix	Static verb		
Position	Dialect	Prefix	stands	sits	lies
Body position / pose	Adyghe	щы- [ɕə]	щыт [ɕət]	щыс [ɕəs]	щылъ [ɕəɬ]
Body position / pose	Kabardian	щы- [ɕə]	щыт [ɕət]	щыс [ɕəs]	щылъ [ɕəɬ]
On	Adyghe	те- [taj]	тет [tat]	тес [tas]	телъ [taɬ]
On	Kabardian	те- [taj]	тет [tat]	тес [tas]	телъ [taɬ]
Under	Adyghe	чӀэ- [ʈ͡ʂʼa]	чӀэт [ʈ͡ʂʼat]	чӀэс [ʈ͡ʂʼas]	чӀэлъ [ʈ͡ʂʼaɬ]
Under	Kabardian	щӀэ- [ɕʼa]	щӀэт [ɕʼat]	щӀэс [ɕʼas]	щӀэлъ [ɕʼaɬ]
Among / within a mass	Adyghe	хэ- [xa]	хэт [xat]	хэс [xas]	хэлъ [xaɬ]
Among / within a mass	Kabardian	хэ- [xa]	хэт [xat]	хэс [xas]	хэлъ [xaɬ]
Within an area / inside an object	Adyghe	дэ- [da]	дэт [dat]	дэс [das]	дэлъ [daɬ]
Within an area / inside an object	Kabardian	дэ- [da]	дэт [dat]	дэс [das]	дэлъ [daɬ]
Around	Adyghe	Ӏу- [ʔʷə]	Ӏут [ʔʷət]	Ӏус [ʔʷəs]	Ӏулъ [ʔʷəɬ]
Around	Kabardian	Ӏу- [ʔʷə]	Ӏут [ʔʷət]	Ӏус [ʔʷəs]	Ӏулъ [ʔʷəɬ]
Inside	Adyghe	и- [jə]	ит [jət]	ис [jəs]	илъ [jəɬ]
Inside	Kabardian	и- [jə]	ит [jət]	ис [jəs]	илъ [jəɬ]
Hanged / attached	Adyghe	пы- [pə]	пыт [pət]	пыс [pəs]	пылъ [pəɬ]
Hanged / attached	Kabardian	пы- [pə]	пыт [pət]	пыс [pəs]	пылъ [pəɬ]
Behind	Adyghe	къо- [qʷa]	къот [qʷat]	къос [qʷas]	къолъ [qʷaɬ]
Behind	Kabardian	къуэ- [qʷa]	къуэт [qʷat]	къуэс [qʷas]	къуэлъ [qʷaɬ]
Aside	Adyghe	го- [ɡʷa]	гот [ɡʷat]	гос [ɡʷas]	голъ [ɡʷaɬ]
Aside	Kabardian	гуэ- [ɡʷa]	гуэт [ɡʷat]	гуэс [ɡʷas]	гуэлъ [ɡʷaɬ]
Inside within	Adyghe	кӀоцӀы- [kʷʼat͡sʼə]	кӀоцӀыт [kʷʼat͡sʼət]	кӀоцӀыс [kʷʼat͡sʼəs]	кӀоцӀылъ [kʷʼat͡sʼəɬ]
Inside within	Kabardian	кӀуэцӀ- [kʷʼat͡sʼ]	кӀуэцӀыт [kʷʼat͡sʼət]	кӀуэцӀыс [kʷʼat͡sʼəs]	кӀуэцӀылъ [kʷʼat͡sʼəɬ]

Adyghe:

шхыныр Ӏанэм телъ
шхын-ыр Ӏанэ-м те-лъ
ʃxənər ʔaːnam tajɬ
food-ABS table-ERG on-lay.PRS
"The food is on the table."

Kabardian:

шхыныр Ӏэнэм телъщ
шхын-ыр Ӏэнэ-м те-лъ-щ
ʃxənər ʔanam tajɬɕ
food-ABS table-OBL on-lay.PRS
"The food is on the table."

Adyghe:

кӀалэхэр тучаным Ӏутых
кӀалэ-хэ-р тучан-ым Ӏут-ых
t͡ʃʼaːɮaxar tut͡ʃaːnəm ʔʷətəx
boy-PL-ABS shop-ERG around-stand.PRS
"The boys are standing near the shop."

Kabardian:

щӀалэхэр тучаным Ӏутщ
щӀалэ-хэ-р тучан-ым Ӏу-т-щ
ɕʼaːlaxar tut͡ʃaːnəm ʔʷətɕ
boy-PL-ABS shop-OBL around-stand.PRS
"The boys are standing near the shop."

== Verbal infixes ==
=== Negative (-мы-) ===
The negative infix -мы- [-mə-] (identical) negates non-finite forms, imperatives and participles; it sits directly before the root, after any prefixes. In Adyghe it is obligatory (instead of the suffix -п) in negative imperatives, before subordinating and connective suffixes, and on infinitives. (Finite indicatives instead take the suffix -къым in Kabardian, -п in Adyghe; in Adyghe -мы- and -п are mutually exclusive.)

Verb forms
Adyghe	Kabardian	Meaning
кӀо → умыкӀу	кӀуэ → умыкӀуэ	"go" → "don't go"
Ӏо → умыӀу	жыӀэ → жумыӀэ	"say" → "don't say"
мыкӀон	мыкӀуэн	"to not go (negated infinitive)"

Example sentences
Adyghe	Kabardian	Meaning
Аущтэу умышӀ!	Апхуэдэу умыщӀ!	"Do not do it like that!"

=== Optative (-рэ-) ===
The Adyghe infix -рэ- [-ra-] marks the optative mood (a wish); the 3rd-person prefix мэ- is replaced by у-. The infix sits directly after the personal prefix and, when the verb is negated, precedes the negative -мы-. Kabardian uses the suffix -щэрэ instead (see below).

Verb forms
Adyghe (-рэ-)	Kabardian (-щэрэ(т))	Meaning
сэрэхъужь	сыхъужыщэрэт	"may I become healthy"
урэмылӀ	умылӀэщэрэт	"may (s)he not die"

Example sentences
Adyghe	Kabardian	Meaning
Мы уцым уерэгъэхъужь.	Мы удзым укъигъэхъужыщэрэт.	"May this plant cure you."

== Verbal suffixes ==
Verbal suffixes follow the root and encode direction, aspect, tense, mood, modality, degree, negation and subordination. Many are shared; differences of form are shown in each table.

=== Directional suffixes ===
Directional suffixes specify a direction of motion; unlike the directional preverbs they normally co-occur with one.

==== Upward (-и / -е) ====
Motion upwards (or against a flow), with the preverb дэ- / д(э)-.

Verb forms
Adyghe	Kabardian	Meaning
кӀон → дэкӀоен	кӀуэн → дэкӀуеин	"go" → "to go upwards"
лъэн → дэлъеин	лъэн → дэлъеин	"jump" → "to leap up"
чъэн → дэчъэен	жэн → дэжеин	"run" → "to run upwards"
плъэн → деплъыен	плъэн → дэплъеин	"look" → "to look upwards"

Example sentences
Adyghe	Kabardian	Meaning
КӀалэр унашъхьэм дэкӀуае.	ЩӀалэр унащхьэм дэкӀуей.	"The boy is going up to the roof."

==== Downward (-хы) ====
Motion downward (identical), with the preverb е-; in Kabardian some stems show ablaut.

Verb forms
Adyghe	Kabardian	Meaning
ечъэхын	ежэхын	"to run / roll down"
еплъэхын	еплъыхын	"to look down"
ехьыхын	ехьэхын	"to lower, to let down"

Example sentences
Adyghe	Kabardian	Meaning
Псыр джабэм къыридзыхы.	Псыр джабэм хуабжьу йожэх.	"The river streams swiftly down the slope."
Бзыор уашъом къедзыхы.	Бзур уафэм къедзых.	"The bird is falling down from the sky."

==== Directed toward / up to (-лӀ) ====
Action directed toward or applied to a target/endpoint (identical).

Verb forms
Adyghe	Kabardian	Meaning
екӀолӀэн	екӀуэлӀэн	"to approach, go up to"
ехьылӀэн	ехьэлӀэн	"to carry (something) to"
ечъэлӀэн	ежэлӀэн	"to run up to"
ехъулӀэн	ехъулӀэн	"(an event) to happen to someone"

Example sentences
Adyghe	Kabardian	Meaning
КӀалэр гъогум екӀуалӀэ.	ЩӀалэр гъуэгум екӀуэлӀэ.	"The boy is approaching the road."

==== Around / over an area (-хь) ====
Action around an object, over an area, or repeatedly/nonstop (identical).

Verb forms
Adyghe	Kabardian	Meaning
зичъэхьын	къэжыхьын	"to run about / in circles"
къэкӀохьын	къэкӀухьын	"to walk around (it)"
тепсэлъыхьын	тепсэлъыхьын	"to discuss, talk about"

Example sentences
Adyghe	Kabardian	Meaning
Сэ чылэр къэскӀохьышт.	Сэ къуажэр къэскӀухьынщ.	"I will walk around the village."
Ӏуашъхьэм къэкӀохьын.	Ӏуащхьэм къэкӀухьын.	"to walk round the hill"

=== Aspect ===
==== Completive — "already" (-гъах) ====
Absolute accomplishment — the action is already fully done.

Verb forms
Adyghe	Kabardian	Meaning
кӀо → кӀогъах	кӀуэ → кӀуагъахэ	"go" → "already went"
сыкӀогъахэп	сыкӀуагъахэкъым	"I still haven't finished going" (negated)

Example sentences
Adyghe	Kabardian	Meaning
КӀалэр еджапӀэм кӀогъах.	ЩӀалэр еджапӀэм кӀуагъахэщ.	"The boy already went to school."
Сшхыгъах.	Сшхыгъахэщ.	"I have already eaten it."

==== Repetitive — again / back (-ж / -жь) ====
Recurrence or restoration ("again, back"), or continuing or finally completing an action already begun; also doing something without another's intervention (oneself), and in Adyghe doing it too late.

Verb forms
Adyghe	Kabardian	Meaning
кӀон → кӀожьын	кӀуэн → кӀуэжын	"go" → "to return"
къэсын → къэсыжьын	къэсын → къэсыжын	"arrive" → "to arrive back"
шхыжьын	шхыжын	"to eat by oneself (without another's intervention)"

Example sentences
Adyghe	Kabardian	Meaning
ЛӀым иӀоф ышӀэжьыгъ.	ЛӀым и Ӏуэху ищӀэжащ.	"The man has (finally) finished his work."
...псы джы чӀэогъэхьажьа?	...псы иджы щӀэбгъэхьэжрэ?	"Are you watering (a dead flower) now? (too late)"

==== Thorough completive (-пэ) ====
Kabardian -пэ marks the action carried out fully, to its endpoint. Adyghe has the cognate -пэ in the same function.

Verb forms
Adyghe	Kabardian	Meaning
лэжьыпэн	лэжьыпэн	"to accomplish in full"
шхыпэн	шхыпэн	"to eat (something) up entirely"

Example sentences
Adyghe	Kabardian	Meaning
Ӏофыр ылэжьыпагъ.	Ӏуэхур илэжьыпащ.	"He accomplished the work in full."

==== Absolute completive (-кӀэ) ====
Kabardian -кӀэ marks absolute completeness, stronger than -пэ. (Homophone of the Adyghe manner/conditional -кӀэ, a distinct morpheme.)

Example sentences
Adyghe	Kabardian	Meaning
—	СщӀакӀэщ.	"I have already (fully) done it."

==== Proximative — about to / almost (-пэт) ====
Adyghe -пэт [-pat]: a verb is about to happen, or "almost" did.

Verb forms
Adyghe	Kabardian	Meaning
кӀопэт	—	"is about to go"
кӀопэтыгъ	—	"almost went"

Example sentences
Adyghe	Kabardian	Meaning
КӀалэхэмэ сыкъаубытыпэтыгъ.	—	"The boys almost caught me."

==== Recent past — just now (-гъакӀ) ====
Adyghe -гъакӀ [-ʁaːt͡ʃʼ]: the action happened just recently.

Verb forms
Adyghe	Kabardian	Meaning
кӀуагъ → кӀогъакӀ	—	"went" → "just went recently"

Example sentences
Adyghe	Kabardian	Meaning
Класым иджы скъихьэгъакӀ.	—	"I just came into the class right now."

==== Temporary — for a while (-гу) ====
Adyghe -гу [-ɡʷ]: an action done for a period, or "for now".

Verb forms
Adyghe	Kabardian	Meaning
сэкӀо → сэкӀого	—	"I go" → "I am going for now"

Example sentences
Adyghe	Kabardian	Meaning
КӀалэр тучанэм кӀуагъэгу.	—	"The boy went to the shop for a while."

==== Continuative — always (-зэпыт) ====
Adyghe -зэпыт [-zapət]: the verb always/continuously happens.

Verb forms
Adyghe	Kabardian	Meaning
кӀозэпыт	—	"always goes"

Example sentences
Adyghe	Kabardian	Meaning
Сэ сэчъэзэпыт щэджэгъожым.	—	"I am always running in the afternoon."

==== Habitual (-рей / -рый) ====
A habitual tendency or characteristic.

Verb forms
Adyghe	Kabardian	Meaning
мэгущыӀэрый	мэпсэлъэрей	"is garrulous (fond of talking)"
мэбэнэрый	мэдауэрей	"is a brawler"
еплъы → еплъырый	еплъ → еплърей	"looks" → "usually looks"

Adyghe also has the dialectal variant -рас / -расэ (еплъырас "usually looks").

Example sentences
Adyghe	Kabardian	Meaning
Сэ лимон сышхырасэрэп.	Сэ лимон сшхырейкъым.	"I don't usually eat lemon."

=== Mood ===
==== Conditional (-мэ) ====
The conditional mood ("if"; identical). It cannot co-occur with the concessive -ми.

Verb forms
Adyghe	Kabardian	Meaning
кӀуагъ → кӀуагъэмэ	кӀуа → кӀуамэ	"went" → "if (s)he went"

Example sentences
Adyghe	Kabardian	Meaning
Ар къакӀомэ, сэ бэзэрым сыкӀощт.	Ар къакӀуэмэ, сэ бэзэрым сыкӀуэнущ.	"If he comes, I will go to the market."
КӀалэр лажьэмэ ахъщэ къыратыщт.	ЩӀалэр лажьэмэ ахъшэ иратынущ.	"If the boy works, they will give him money."

==== Temporal conditional — "when" (-кӀэ) ====
Adyghe -кӀэ [-t͡ʃʼ] also expresses condition, chiefly with the temporal prefix з- ("when").

Example sentences
Adyghe	Kabardian	Meaning
Фылымыр къызыублэкӀэ къысаӀу.	—	"Tell me when the movie starts."
Шъхьэнгъупчъэр къегъас къызещхыкӀэ.	—	"Close the windows when it rains."

==== Concessive (-ми) ====
The concessive mood ("even if"; identical), historically conditional -м(э) + connective -и.

Verb forms
Adyghe	Kabardian	Meaning
кӀуагъэми	кӀуами	"even if (s)he went"
къакӀоми	къэкӀуэми	"even if (s)he comes"

Example sentences
Adyghe	Kabardian	Meaning
Улажьэми ахъщэ къыуатыщтэп.	Улэжьэми ахъшэ къуатынкъым.	"Even if you work, they will not give you money."

==== Counterfactual — past subjunctive (-тэмэ / -гъагъэмэ) ====
Past counterfactual ("if X had happened"). Kabardian -тэмэ (past -т + -мэ); Adyghe stacks the far-past -гъагъэ with -мэ.

Verb forms
Adyghe (-гъагъэмэ)	Kabardian (-тэмэ)	Meaning
сыкӀогъагъэмэ	сыкӀуатэмэ	"if I had gone"
жиӀэгъагъэмэ	жиӀатэмэ	"if (s)he had said"

Example sentences
Adyghe	Kabardian	Meaning
Экзамыным сыфеджэгъагъэмэ, дэгъоу сшӀышъущтыгъ.	Экзаменым сыхуеджатэмэ, фӀыуэ сщӀэфынут.	"If I had studied for the exam, I could have done well."

==== Past concessive (-тэми / -гъагъэми) ====
"Even if X had happened" (past counterfactual + connective -и).

Verb forms
Adyghe (-гъагъэми)	Kabardian (-тэми)	Meaning
кӀогъагъэми	кӀуатэми	"even if (s)he had gone (then)"
укӀогъагъэми	укӀуатэми	"even if you had gone"

==== Optative (-щэрэ / -гъот) ====
A wish ("if only…, I wish…"). Kabardian -щэрэ(т); Adyghe -гъот/-гъует/-гъэмэ (and the present-wish infix -рэ- above).

Verb forms
Adyghe (-гъот)	Kabardian (-щэрэ(т))	Meaning
укӀуагъот	укӀуащэрэт	"if only you had gone"
седжэгъамэ	седжащэрэт	"if only I had studied"

Example sentences
Adyghe	Kabardian	Meaning
Налшык сыкӀогъот.	Налшык сыкӀуащэрэт.	"I wish I could go to Nalchik."
Илъэгъугъот.	Илъэгъуащэрэт.	"If only he could see it."

==== Interrogative (-а) ====
Both standards form polar questions with the suffix -а [aː], which lengthens the final vowel; in Adyghe a negated (-п) verb takes the question form -ба.

Verb forms
Adyghe	Kabardian	Meaning
кӀо → кӀуа?	кӀуэ → кӀуа?	"go" → "is (s)he going?"
кӀуа? → кӀоба?	—	"→ isn't (s)he going? (negative question)"

Example sentences
Adyghe	Kabardian	Meaning
КӀалэр къэущыжьыгъа?	ЩӀалэр къэушыжьа?	"Did the boy wake up?"
Ар къэкӀуагъа?	КъэкӀуа ар?	"Did he come?"
Ары, къэкӀуагъ.	НытӀэ, къэкӀуащ.	"Yes, he came." (answer)

==== Mirative — surprise (-уи) ====
Both standards mark the mirative (surprise, "really!?") with the suffix -уи / -уи.

Verb forms
Adyghe	Kabardian	Meaning
кӀо → кӀоуи	кӀуэ → кӀуауи	"go → (s)he went!?"
усымаджэ → усымаджэуи	усымаджэ → усымаджэуи	"you are sick → you're sick!? (surprise)"

Example sentences
Adyghe	Kabardian	Meaning
А кӀалэ кӀакор кӀуачӀэуи?	А щӀалэ кӀэщӀыр лъэщуи?	"That short boy is strong (surprise)?"

==== Apprehensive — warning (-къон) ====
Adyghe -къон [-qʷan] warns or intimidates ("don't dare to").

Verb forms
Adyghe	Kabardian	Meaning
уеплъы → уеплъыкъон	—	"you look → don't you dare look"

Example sentences
Adyghe	Kabardian	Meaning
Унашъхьэм укъепкӀэкъон.	—	"Don't dare jump from the roof."

==== Imperative — emphatic (-т) ====
Kabardian -т: a softened or insistent imperative ("do…, just…").

Verb forms
Adyghe	Kabardian	Meaning
—	жыӀэт	"do say; just say"
—	тхэт	"just write"

==== Desiderative (-рагъу) ====
Desire ("want to"); characteristic of the Shapsug dialect.

Verb forms
Adyghe	Kabardian	Meaning
сэкӀо → скӀорагъу	—	"I go → I want to go"

Example sentences
Adyghe	Kabardian	Meaning
Дышъэм фэдэу пшъашъэр дэхэрагъу.	—	"The girl wants to be pretty like gold."

=== Modality and degree ===
==== Potential — capability (-ф / -шъу) ====
The potential ("be able to, manage to"). The forms differ: Kabardian -ф(ы), Adyghe -шъу.

Verb forms
Adyghe	Kabardian	Meaning
Ӏошъун	жыӀэфын	"to be able to say"
тхышъун	тхыфын	"to be able to write"
кӀошъун	кӀуэфын	"to be able to go"
кӀошъущт	кӀуэфынущ	"will be able to go"

Example sentences
Adyghe	Kabardian	Meaning
КӀалэм шхыныр фэшхышъурэп сымаджэти.	ЩӀалэм шхыныр ишхыфыркъым сымаджэщи.	"The boy can't eat the food because he's sick."

==== Excessive (-къуэ, -щ / -щ) ====
Kabardian marks excess ("too much, to excess") with -къуэ and with -щ (II). Adyghe has the cognate -щ.

Verb forms
Adyghe	Kabardian	Meaning
шхэщагъ	шхэщащ	"ate to excess, gluttonized"
—	псэлъэкъуэн	"to out-talk somebody; to talk too much"

==== Slight excess (-Ӏуэ / -Ӏо) ====
Slight excessiveness — a little more than necessary.

Verb forms
Adyghe	Kabardian	Meaning
тхэӀон	тхэӀуэн	"to write a bit more than necessary"
кӀотаӀо	кӀуэтэӀуэ	"move a little further"
ӀэтыӀо	ӀэтыӀуэ	"lift slightly higher"

==== Difficulty and facility (-гъуейуэ, -гъуафӀэ / -гъуай, -гъошӀу) ====
Adyghe marks that an action is difficult (-гъуай) or easy (-гъошӀу) to do.

Verb forms
Adyghe	Kabardian	Meaning
тхын → тхыгъуай	тхын → тхыгъуейуэ	"difficult to write"
тхын → тхыгъошӀу	тхын → тхыгъуафӀэ	"easy to write"

Example sentences
Adyghe	Kabardian	Meaning
Джанэр дыгъошӀу.	Джанэр дыгъуафӀэ.	"The dress is easily sewn."

==== Obligative — "should have" (-пхъагъ) ====
Adyghe -пхъагъ [-pχaːʁ]: the subject should have done the action but did not.

Verb forms
Adyghe	Kabardian	Meaning
кӀуагъ → кӀопхъагъ	—	"went → should have gone"

Example sentences
Adyghe	Kabardian	Meaning
...сидиск къэпхьыпхъагъ.	—	"You should have brought my disk."

==== Volitional (-п) and accidental (-хъу) ====
Adyghe minor suffixes: -п "willingly", -хъу "mistakenly/irrelevantly".

Verb forms
Adyghe	Kabardian	Meaning
сыкӀопэн	—	"I will go willingly"
Ӏохъу	—	"to speak irrelevantly / by mistake"

=== Negation ===
==== Finite negative (-къым / -п) ====
The finite indicative negator. The two standards differ: Kabardian -къым, Adyghe -п (-эп; -рэп in the present).

Verb forms
Adyghe (-п/-эп/-рэп)	Kabardian (-къым)	Meaning
кӀуагъ → кӀуагъэп	кӀуа → кӀуакъым	"went" → "did not go"
макӀо → кӀорэп	мэкӀуэ → кӀуэркъым	"goes" → "is not going"

Example sentences
Adyghe	Kabardian	Meaning
Сэ еджапӀэм сыкӀуагъэп.	Сэ еджапӀэм сыкӀуакъым.	"I didn't go to school."
Ащ ар ышӀэрэп.	Абы ар ищӀэркъым.	"He doesn't know that."
Ахэр къэкӀуагъэхэп.	Ахэр къэкӀуахэкъым.	"They didn't come."

==== Emphatic — "absolutely / definitely" (-ххэ / -х) ====
An emphatic degree: Kabardian -ххэ reinforces negation ("definitely not", usually with -къым) and -хэ/-ххэ marks constant readiness; Adyghe -х marks "definitely (not)".

Verb forms
Adyghe (-х)	Kabardian (-ххэ/-хэ)	Meaning
сымыкӀохэн	сыкӀуэххэнкъым	"I will definitely not go"
сыкӀохэн	—	"I will definitely go"
—	сыхьэзырыхэщ	"I am always / absolutely ready"

=== Subordinating suffixes ===
==== Simultaneous — "while" (-уэ / -эу) ====
Both standards form a simultaneous converb ("while"); the vowel order differs by dialect (Kabardian -уэ, Adyghe -эу). With the negative -мы- it gives "instead of" and, with a tense, "before". It attaches to a present-tense root, while the main verb that follows carries the tense.

Verb forms
Adyghe	Kabardian	Meaning
сэкӀо → сыкӀоу	сокӀуэ → сыкӀуэуэ	"go → while going"

Example sentences
Adyghe	Kabardian	Meaning
СыкӀоу кӀалэр слъэгъугъ.	СыкӀуэуэ щӀалэр слъэгъуащ.	"While I was going, I saw the boy."
Уемыджэу тэ къэтдэджэгу.	Уемыджэу дэ къыддэджэгу.	"Instead of studying, play with us."

==== Terminative — "until" (-хуэ / -фэ, -нэс) ====
Both standards mark an event lasting until.

Verb forms
Adyghe (-фэ/-нэс)	Kabardian (-хуэ)	Meaning
сэкӀо → скӀофэ / скӀонэс	сокӀуэ → сыкӀуэхукӀэ	"go → until (one) goes"

Example sentences
Adyghe	Kabardian	Meaning
КӀалэр кӀофэ паплъ.	ЩӀалэр кӀуэхукӀэ паплъэ.	"Wait until the boy goes."
Чэщынэс лажьэгу.	Жэщ хъухукӀэ лажьэ.	"Work until it is night."

==== Anterior and posterior — before / after (-пэу, -уж, -ным) ====
Adyghe temporal suffixes: -пэу (with -мы-) "before", -уж "after", -ным "the moment about to".

Verb forms
Adyghe	Kabardian	Meaning
кӀо → мыкӀуапэу	—	"before (s)he goes" (-пэу)
кӀо → кӀоужым	—	"after (s)he went" (-уж)
сэкӀо → скӀоным	—	"the moment (one) was about to go" (-ным)

=== Other suffixes ===
==== Coordinative — connective (-и) ====
The connective "and/also", linking actions. On present-tense verbs Adyghe -и chains past events, whereas -ни chains future or planned ones; -и also serves in the imperative ("come and …").

Example sentences
Adyghe	Kabardian	Meaning
КъакӀуи еплъ.	КъакӀуи еплъ.	"Come and have a look."
Щыси еджэ.	Щыси еджэ.	"Sit and read."
КӀалэр кӀони псы къэтфихьыщт.	—	"The boy will go and bring us water." (Adyghe future chain)

==== Infinitive / masdar (-н) ====
The infinitive (verbal noun, masdar); the citation form (identical).

Verb forms
Adyghe	Kabardian	Meaning
тхэн	тхэн	"to write"
кӀон	кӀуэн	"to go"
лэжьэн	лэжьэн	"to work"
еплъын	еплъын	"to look at"

==== Plural (-хэ) ====
Marks a 3rd-person plural absolutive argument — the subject of an intransitive verb or the direct object of a transitive verb — and also pluralises nouns; identical.

Verb forms
Adyghe	Kabardian	Meaning
кӀалэ → кӀалэхэ	щӀалэ → щӀалэхэ	"boy → boys"

Example sentences
Adyghe	Kabardian	Meaning
Ахэр къэкӀуагъэх.	КъэкӀуахэщ.	"They came."
Ахэр еджагъэх.	Еджэхэщ.	"They read."
Илъэсхэр псынкӀэу блэкӀых.	Илъэсхэр псынщӀэу блокӀых.	"The years are passing fast."

==== Preliminary action (-хэ) ====
A homophonous -хэ marks a preliminary action — one done first, before another (it does not index plurality).

Verb forms
Adyghe	Kabardian	Meaning
зытхьэкӀыхэн	зытхьэщӀыхэн	"to wash oneself first"

Example sentences
Adyghe	Kabardian	Meaning
ЗытхьэкӀыхи шхэ.	ЗытхьэщӀыхи шхэ.	"First wash yourself, and then eat."

==== Affirmative (-щ) ====
Kabardian -щ (I) is an affirmative/assertive suffix.

Example sentences
Adyghe	Kabardian	Meaning
—	КъэкӀуа? — НытӀэ, къэкӀуащ.	"Did he come? — Yes, he came."

==== Manner (-кӀэ) ====
The suffix -кӀэ / -кӀэ [-t͡ʃʼa] (Shapsug -кӀьэ) — identical in both standards — derives a noun denoting the manner or way in which an action is done (and, when possessed, "someone's way of …"). It is the same element as the shared instrumental case marker -кӀэ, and is distinct from the homophonous conditional and completive -кӀэ.

Verb forms
Adyghe	Kabardian	Meaning
тхэн → тхакӀэ	тхэн → тхэкӀэ	"write → manner of writing"
лэжьэн → лэжьакӀэ	лэжьэн → лэжьэкӀэ	"work → manner of working"
кӀон → икӀуакӀэ	кӀуэн → икӀуэкӀэ	"go → his manner of walking" (possessive)

Example sentences
Adyghe	Kabardian	Meaning
КӀалэм тэрэзэу тхакӀэ къырагъэшӀагъ.	ЩӀалэм захуэу тхэкӀэ ирагъэщӀащ.	"They taught the boy how to write correctly."

==== Tense ====
Neither source treats tense as a single affix slot; both build it by stacking. Kabardian -гъэ (-гъа) marks the past perfect/pluperfect; the suffix -рт marks iterative or habitual action in the past ("used to …", "kept …").

Tense	Adyghe (e.g. кӀон "go")	Kabardian
Recent past	кӀуагъ (-гъ)	кӀуащ (-ащ)
Far past / pluperfect	кӀогъагъ (-гъагъ)	кӀуагъащ (-гъэ)
Future	кӀощт (-щт)	кӀуэнущ (-нущ)
Future-of-past	кӀощтыгъ (-щтыгъ)	кӀуэнут

== Combining morphemes ==
The power of Circassian verbal morphology lies in the fact that these prefixes, infixes and suffixes combine in a single verb to yield highly specific meanings. One verb can simultaneously carry information about direction, voluntariness, aspect, mood, negation and the person/number of its participants — what English needs a whole clause to express.

Starting from Kabardian кӀуэн "to go":

къэкӀуэн	"to come (here)"
къэкӀуэжын	"to come back"
къэмыкӀуэжын	"not to come back"
къэкӀуэжыфын	"to be able to come back"
къэкӀуэжыфынущ	"he will be able to come back"
къэмыкӀуэжыфынутэмэ	"if he had not been able to come back"

The Adyghe verb къыпфэсхьыщтэп "I will not bring it for you" is segmented къы-п-фэ-с-хьы-щт-эп: "from there (къы) – you (п) – for you (фэ, benefactive) – I (с) – bring (хьы) – future (щт) – not (эп)".

== See also ==
- Adyghe language
- Kabardian language
- Circassian languages
- Northwest Caucasian languages
- Adyghe verbs

== Bibliography ==
- Аркадьев, П. М.; Ландер, Ю. А.; Летучий, А. Б.; Сумбатова, Н. Р.; Тестелец, Я. Г. Введение. Основные сведения об адыгейском языке (Arkadiev, P. M.; Lander, Yu. A.; Letuchiy, A. B.; Sumbatova, N. R.; Testelets, Ya. G. Introduction. Basic information about the Adyghe language) in "Aspects of polysyntheticity: studies on Adyghe grammar". Moscow: RGGU, 2009. ISBN 978-5-7281-1075-0 (in Russian)
- Matasović, Ranko. A Short Grammar of East Circassian (Kabardian).
- Kumakhov, Mukhadin & Vamling, Karina. Circassian Clause Structure (Caucasus Studies 1). Malmö: Malmö University, 2009. ISBN 978-91-7104-083-1
- Кумахов, М. А. Морфология адыгских языков. Нальчик, 1964.
- Яковлев, Н. Ф. Грамматика литературного кабардино-черкесского языка. Москва – Ленинград, 1948.
- Рогава, Г. В.; Керашева, З. И. Грамматика адыгейского языка. Краснодар – Майкоп, 1966.
- Урыс, Хь. Щ. Адыгэ грамматикэ. Фонетикэ, морфонемикэ, морфологие. Налшык: «Эльбрус», 2001.
- Яковлев, Н.; Ашхамаф, Д. Грамматика адыгейского литературного языка. Москва – Ленинград, 1941.
