= Mont-Saint-Aignan =

- Commune
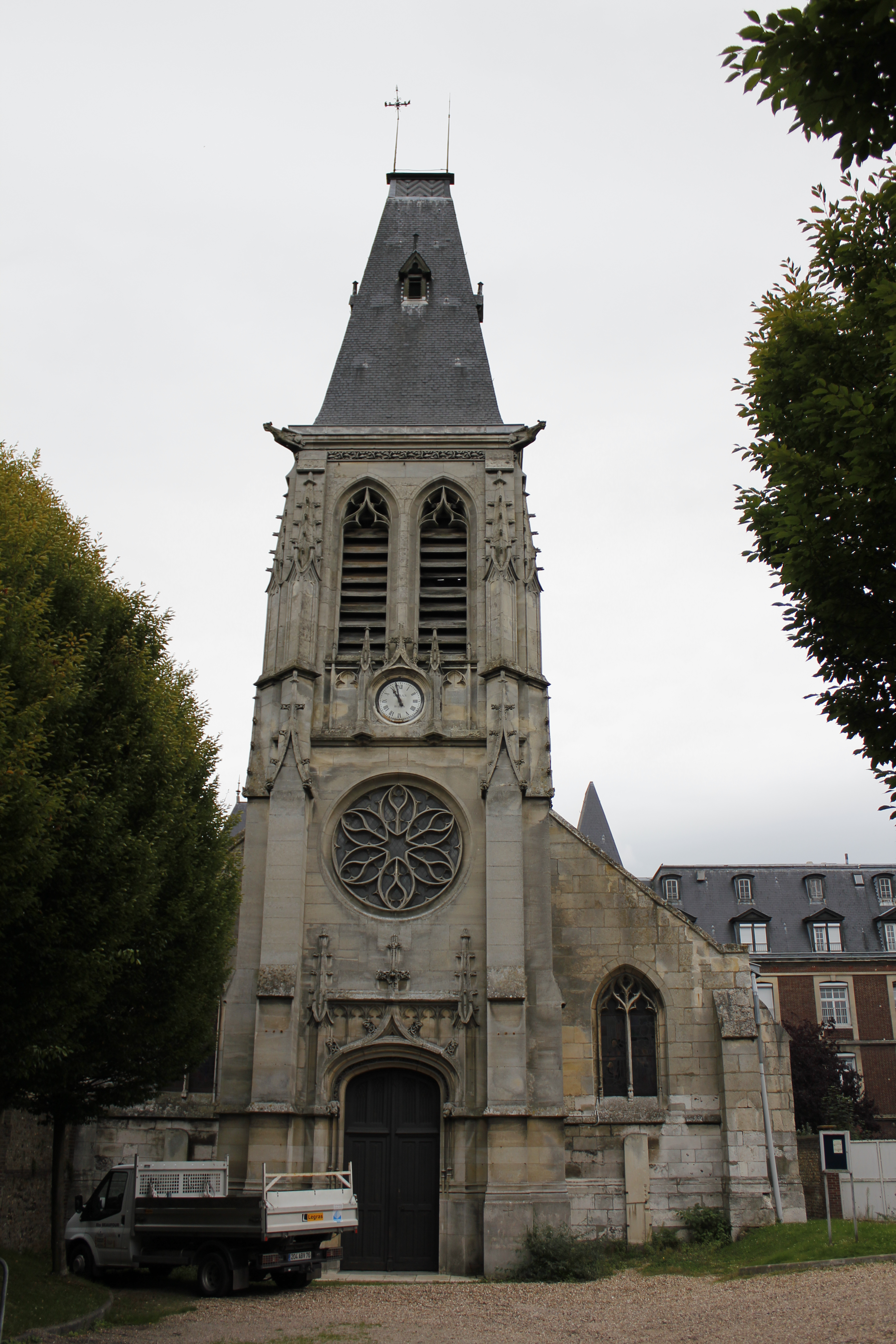
- The church in Mont-Saint-Aignan

- Coat of arms
- Location of Mont-Saint-Aignan
- Location within France Location within Normandy
- Coordinates: 49°27′47″N 1°05′18″E
- Country: France
- Region: Normandy
- Department: Seine-Maritime
- Arrondissement: Rouen
- Canton: Mont-Saint-Aignan
- Intercommunality: Métropole Rouen Normandie

Government
  - Mayor (2020–2026): Catherine Flavigny
- Area^{1}: 7.94 km^{2} (3.07 sq mi)
- Elevation: 145 m (476 ft)
- Highest elevation: 171 m (561 ft)
- Lowest elevation: 44 m (144 ft)
- Population (2023): 20,165
  - Density: 2,540/km^{2} (6,580/sq mi)
- Time zone: UTC+01:00 (CET)
  - Summer (DST): UTC+02:00 (CEST)
- INSEE/Postal code: 76451 /76130
- ^{1} French Land Register data, which excludes lakes, ponds, glaciers > 1 km^{2} (0.386 sq mi or 247 acres) and river estuaries.

Mont-Saint-Aignan (French pronunciation: [mɔ̃ sɛ̃t‿ɛɲɑ̃]) is a commune in the Seine-Maritime department in the region of Normandy, northwestern France.

The inhabitants of the town of Mont-Saint-Aignan are called Mont-Saint-Aignanais in French.

Due to the presence of higher education institutions (notably the University of Rouen and the NEOMA Business School) and the city's relatively small population, Mont-Saint-Aignan is considered the French city that has the largest proportion of students relative to its population (students represented in 2014 25,61% of the total population).

== Geography ==
The town is the fifth-largest suburb of the city of Rouen and lies directly adjacent to the north side of Rouen at the junction of the D121 and D43. In addition to its population of 21,265, there are also around 20,000 students at the university and the various Grandes Écoles.

== History ==
The town is ultimately named for the ancient Saint Aignan of Orleans.

The parishes of Saint-Aignan (Latin: Sanctus Anianus) and Mont-aux-Malades (Monte Infirmorum, which takes its name from a hospital) are mentioned in documents dating back to the 12th century. Henry II built a church there dedicated to Thomas Becket in 1176 in an attempt to make up for his unwitting role in the murder of the Archbishop of Canterbury.

The modern commune of Mont-Saint-Aignan was created in the early 19th century (1815–1819) out of the merger of the communes of Monts-aux-Malades, Saint-Aignan and (partly) Saint-Denis-de-Bondeville.

=== Heraldry ===
Arms of Mont-Saint-Aignan	Arms of Mont-Saint-Aignan are blazoned : Or, a leopard gules within a laurel wreath vert, and on a chief indented azure, 3 fleurs de lys and 2 half ones Or

== People ==
- Jacques Anquetil (1934–1987), first cyclist to win the Tour de France five times
- Viviane Asseyi, footballer
- Ousmane Camara, basketball player
- Flora Coquerel, Miss France 2014
- Maurice Euzennat (1926–2004), historian and archaeologist
- Thierry Foucaud (1954– ), politician
- govy, artist
- Franck Haise, football manager and former player
- Jamel Ait Ben Idir, footballer
- Lagaf', humorist and television presenter
- Sébastien Larcier, footballer
- Pierrick Lebourg, professional footballer
- Matthieu Louis-Jean, footballer
- Jackson Mendy, footballer
- Tony Parker, basketball player
- Mohamed Sissoko, footballer
- Lucien Tesnière (1893–1954), linguist
- Sébastien Le Toux, footballer

== Population ==
Historical population

Year	Pop.	±% p.a.
1793	625	—
1800	976	+6.57%
1806	754	−4.21%
1821	1,617	+5.22%
1831	1,929	+1.78%
1836	2,116	+1.87%
1841	2,382	+2.40%
1846	2,369	−0.11%
1851	2,567	+1.62%
1856	2,603	+0.28%
1861	2,888	+2.10%
1866	3,045	+1.06%
1872	2,909	−0.76%
1876	2,985	+0.65%
1881	3,115	+0.86%
1886	3,408	+1.81%
1891	3,379	−0.17%
1896	3,729	+1.99%
1901	4,151	+2.17%

Year	Pop.	±% p.a.
1906	4,242	+0.43%
1911	4,316	+0.35%
1921	4,942	+1.36%
1926	5,262	+1.26%
1931	5,588	+1.21%
1936	5,845	+0.90%
1946	6,585	+1.20%
1954	7,358	+1.40%
1962	9,989	+3.90%
1968	16,031	+8.20%
1975	19,146	+2.57%
1982	19,736	+0.43%
1990	19,961	+0.14%
1999	21,265	+0.71%
2007	20,207	−0.64%
2012	19,798	−0.41%
2017	18,850	−0.98%
2023	20,165	+1.13%

Source: EHESS and INSEE (1968–2023)

== Places of interest ==
- The church of St. Jacques, dating from the eleventh century, used as a workshop after the Revolution
- The church of St. Thomas, dating from the twelfth century
- The sixteenth century church of St. Aignan
- The nineteenth century church of St. André
- The modern church of Notre-Dame-de-Miséricorde (1970)
- The chapel of the Petit-Séminaire (1862)
- Several ancient houses

== Colleges and universities ==
- University of Rouen
- NEOMA Business School (former École Supérieure de Commerce de Rouen)
- Institut de Formation Internationale (part of the Business School)
- ésitpa (agriculture and agronomy)
- ESIGELEC formerly in Mont-Saint-Aignan; moved in 2004 to nearby Saint-Étienne-du-Rouvray
- Institut National des Sciences Appliquées de Rouen (INSA Rouen) also – since Oct 2009 – now wholly in Saint-Étienne-du-Rouvray

=== Twin towns – sister cities ===
Mont-Saint-Aignan is twinned with:

- Barsinghausen, Germany (1967)
- Edenbridge, England (1973)
- Osica de Sus, Romania (1991)
- Brzeg Dolny, Poland (2003)
- Rouko, Burkina Faso (2010)
