= Pierrick Rakotoharisoa =

French association football player (born 1991)

Personal information
- Date of birth: 4 June 1991 (age 35)
- Place of birth: Sainte-Adresse, France
- Height: 1.74 m (5 ft 9 in)
- Position: Midfielder

Team information
- Current team: Quevilly

Youth career
- 1997–2002: Union Fontainaise
- 2002–2009: Le Havre

Senior career*
| Years | Team | Apps | (Gls) |
| 2009– | Le Havre | 9 | (0) |
| 2010– | Le Havre B | 72 | (3) |
| 2012–2013 | → Quevilly (loan) | 32 | (1) |

International career^{‡}
| 2006–2007 | France U16 | 2 | (0) |
| 2008–2009 | France U18 | 2 | (0) |
| 2010 | France U19 | 1 | (0) |
| 2011 | France U20 | 2 | (0) |
- * Club domestic league appearances and goals as of 19 May 2015 ‡ National team caps and goals as of 9 October 2012

Pierrick Rakotoharisoa (born 4 June 1991) is a French football player of Malagasy descent who currently plays for French club US Quevilly in Championnat National, on loan from Le Havre in Ligue 2. Rakotoharisoa is a France youth international having earned limited caps with the under-16 and under-18 teams. He plays as an attacking midfielder.

== Football career ==
Rakotoharisoa began his career, at age 6, playing for his hometown club Union Fontainaise Foot in the commune of Fontaine-la-Mallet. Union Fontainaise serves as a local feeder club for Le Havre. Following a five-year stint at the club, he transferred to Le Havre and began playing in the club's youth academy. While at the academy, Rakotoharisoa divided his time between football and education starring for Le Havre's under-16 team and also attending Jeanne d'Arc de Saint-Adresse, a high school in his hometown. Rakotoharisoa excelled on the youth level for Le Havre. He was a member of both the 2007–08 and 2008–09 Le Havre under-18 sides that reached the semi-finals of the Coupe Gambardella. For the 2008–09 season, despite being only 17 years old, he was promoted to the club's Championnat de France amateur team. He made 18 total appearances with the CFA team scoring no goals.

Rakotoharisoa was given the opportunity to train with the senior team for the 2009–10 season, though he was still limited to playing in the reserves. After appearing on the bench for several matches during the season, he finally made his debut on 27 November 2009 in a 1–0 victory over AC Ajaccio coming on as a substitute in the 85th minute. The following week, against Caen, he appeared as a late match substitute again, though Le Havre lost the match 0–2.
