= Functional generative description =

Linguistic Framework

Functional generative description (FGD) is a linguistic framework developed at Charles University in Prague since the 1960s by a team led by Petr Sgall. Based on the dependency grammar formalism, it is a stratificational grammar formalism that treats the sentence as a system of interlinked layers: phonological, morphematical, morphonological, analytical (surface syntax) and tectogrammatical (deep syntax). Continuing the tradition of Prague School, special attention is paid to the phenomenon of topic–focus articulation.

The Prague Dependency Treebank (PDT) is a treebank consisting of a subset of the Czech National Corpus annotated along the lines of FGD.
