= Pierrick Lebourg =

French footballer (born 1989)

Personal information
- Date of birth: 30 December 1989 (age 36)
- Place of birth: Mont-Saint-Aignan, France
- Height: 1.83 m (6 ft 0 in)
- Position: Midfielder

Team information
- Current team: Grand-Quevilly

Youth career
- 2006–2007: Le Havre

Senior career*
Years	Team	Apps	(Gls)
2007–2009	Le Havre B	16	(1)
2009	Le Havre	1	(0)
2009–2010	Quevilly-Rouen	5	(0)
2011–2017	Oissel	85	(15)
2017–2018	Rouen	17	(0)
2018–2021	Oissel		
2021–2022	Grand-Quevilly		
2022–2023	Val-de-Reuil		
2023–	Grand-Quevilly	6	(0)
- * Club domestic league appearances and goals as of 7 December 2024

Pierrick Lebourg (born 30 December 1989) is a French professional footballer who plays as a midfielder for Championnat National 3 club Grand-Quevilly.

== Career ==
Lebourg played on the professional level in Ligue 1 for Le Havre AC and made his debut in Ligue 1 on 30 May 2009 in a game against OGC Nice. On 14 June 2009 left his club Le Havre AC to sign for Championnat de France amateur club US Quevilly.
