= Adyghe verbs =

In Adyghe, like all Northwest Caucasian languages, the verb is the most inflected part of speech. Verbs are typically head final and are conjugated for tense, person, number, etc. Some of Circassian verbs can be morphologically simple, some of them consist only of one morpheme, like: кӀо "go", штэ "take". However, generally, Circassian verbs are characterized as structurally and semantically difficult entities. Morphological structure of a Circassian verb includes affixes (prefixes, suffixes) which are specific to the language. Verbal affixes express meaning of subject, direct or indirect object, adverbial, singular or plural form, negative form, mood, direction, mutuality, compatibility and reflexivity, which, as a result, creates a complex verb, that consists of many morphemes and semantically expresses a sentence. For example: уакъыдэсэгъэгущыӀэжьы "I am forcing you to talk to them again" consists of the following morphemes: у-а-къы-дэ-сэ-гъэ-гущыӀэ-жьы, with the following meanings: "you (у) with them (а) from there (къы) together (дэ) I (сэ) am forcing (гъэ) to speak (гущыӀэн) again (жьы)".

Color legend for arguments:

- Absolutive (Abs): Marks the subject of intransitive verbs and direct object of transitive verbs.
- Ergative (Erg): Marks the subject (agent) of transitive verbs.
- Oblique (Obl): Marks indirect objects.

== Structure of the verbal complex ==
The verbal word in Adyghe (West Circassian) consists of both prefixes and suffixes arranged in a rigid sequence of slots relative to the root, numbered from −12 (leftmost prefix) to +7 (rightmost suffix). The arguments of the verb are cross-referenced in the prefixal part of the word: these include the absolutive argument and most participants expressed by the oblique form. The overview below gives the order of the slots, followed by a full list of the markers that fill each one.

=== Slot template (overview) ===
Order of slots in the verb (negative = prefix, 0 = root, positive = suffix)
Prefixes												Root	Suffixes						
−12	−11	−10	−9	−8	−7	−6	−5	−4	−3	−2	−1	0	+1	+2	+3	+4	+5	+6	+7
Abs	Cisl	Manner/ Fact	IO (Obl)	Appl	Loc	Prep	Agt (Erg)	Dyn	Opt	Neg	Caus	√ ROOT	Rep	Pot	Tense	Real	Pl	Dyn	Mood/ Neg

=== Markers filling each slot ===
Markers filling each slot of the Adyghe verb
Slot	Category	Marker	Gloss / meaning
−12	Absolutive	с-	1SG
−12	Absolutive	у-	2SG
−12	Absolutive	т-	1PL
−12	Absolutive	шъу-	2PL
−12	Absolutive	∅	3 (no overt marker)
−11	Cislocative	къ-	hither
−10	Manner / Factive	зэрэ-	the way that…; factive
−9	Indirect object (Oblique)	с-	1SG
−9	Indirect object (Oblique)	у-, п-	2SG
−9	Indirect object (Oblique)	т-	1PL
−9	Indirect object (Oblique)	шъу-	2PL
−9	Indirect object (Oblique)	е-	3SG
−9	Indirect object (Oblique)	а-, я-	3PL
−8	Applicative	фэ-	for (benefactive)
−8	Applicative	шӀо-	against (malefactive)
−8	Applicative	дэ-	with (comitative)
−7	Locative	щы-	at
−6	Prepositional (locative preverbs)	те-	on
−6	Prepositional (locative preverbs)	чӀэ-	under
−6	Prepositional (locative preverbs)	хэ-	within / among
−6	Prepositional (locative preverbs)	дэ-	in
−6	Prepositional (locative preverbs)	пы-	on / attached to
−6	Prepositional (locative preverbs)	и-	in(side)
−6	Prepositional (locative preverbs)	къо-	behind
−6	Prepositional (locative preverbs)	Ӏу-	at / near
−6	Prepositional (locative preverbs)	го-	beside
−6	Prepositional (locative preverbs)	бгъодэ-	beside / next to
−6	Prepositional (locative preverbs)	кӀоцӀы-	within / inside
−5	Agent (Ergative)	с-	1SG
−5	Agent (Ergative)	у-	2SG
−5	Agent (Ergative)	т-	1PL
−5	Agent (Ergative)	шъу-	2PL
−5	Agent (Ergative)	е-	3SG
−5	Agent (Ergative)	а-, я-	3PL
−4	'Dynamic' prefix	мэ-	3rd person
−4	'Dynamic' prefix	э-	positive present
−3	Optative	рэ-	optative
−2	Negation	мы-	negation (NEG)
−1	Causative	гъэ-	causative (CAUS)
0	Root	[verb]	verb stem
+1	Repetition	-жь	again (re-)
+2	Potential	-шъу	can / be able to
+3	Tense	-гъэ	past (PST)
+3	Tense	-щт	future (FUT)
+3	Tense	-щтыгъ	imperfect (IMPF)
+3	Tense	-гъагъ	past perfect (PP)
+4	Realization / Completion	-х	realization / completion
+5	Plural	-х	3rd person plural absolutive (PL)
+6	Dynamic suffix	-рэ	dynamic suffix
+7	Mood / Negation	-п	negative (NEG)
+7	Mood / Negation	-мэ	conditional (COND)
+7	Mood / Negation	-ми	concessive (CONC)
+7	Mood / Negation	-а	interrogative (Q)
+7	Mood / Negation	-ба	negative interrogative (NEG.Q)
+7	Mood / Negation	-и	and (additive)
+7	Mood / Negation	-эу	adverbial (ADV)

Morphological breakdown of плъэ
Morphological breakdown	English translation
плъэ	look
сэ-плъэ	I look
сы-о-плъы	I look at you
с-къы-о-плъы	I look at you
с-къы-п-те-плъэ	I look upon you
с-къы-зэрэ-п-те-плъэ-рэ-р	The way I look upon you
с-къы-п-фэ-те-плъэ	I look upon him for you
с-къы-зэрэ-п-фэ-те-плъэ-рэ-р	The way I look upon him for you
с-къы-зэрэ-п-те-плъэ-жьы-шъу-гъа-хэ-р	The way I already was able to look upon you again

== Transitivity and valency ==
Verbs in Adyghe can be ditransitive, transitive or intransitive. Depending on their valency (the number of arguments they require), they fall into four main types:

- Monovalent intransitive verbs
- Bivalent intransitive verbs
- Bivalent transitive verbs
- Trivalent ditransitive verbs

A fundamental rule of Adyghe grammar is that a verb can contain at most three arguments: one Absolutive (marked -р), one Ergative (marked -м), and one Oblique (marked -м). The ergative and oblique share the same suffix -м; they are told apart by the verb's transitivity and by word order, not by the ending itself.

Beyond these four types, there are labile (ambitransitive) verbs, where the direct object of the transitive use corresponds to the subject of the intransitive use, and causative verbs, which raise valency by turning an intransitive verb into a transitive one, or a bivalent transitive into a trivalent one.

=== Monovalent intransitive verbs ===
A monovalent intransitive verb has no direct object. Its single argument — the subject — stands in the absolutive case (-р).

Sentence	Gloss	Function	Translation
ЛӀыр мэчъые	Man-ABS sleeps	S VERB	"The man is sleeping."
ПэсакӀор макӀо	Guard-ABS goes	S VERB	"The security guard is going."

=== Bivalent intransitive verbs ===
Intransitive verbs can also take an indirect object. The subject remains in the absolutive case (-р), while the indirect object (a target, source or location) takes the oblique case (-м).

Sentence	Gloss	Function	Translation
КӀалэр тхылъым еджэ	Boy-ABS book-OBL reads	S IO VERB	"The boy reads the book."
КӀалэр пшъашъэм ебэу	Boy-ABS girl-OBL kisses	S IO VERB	"The boy kisses the girl."

=== Bivalent transitive verbs ===
In a transitive sentence the subject (agent) is in the ergative case (-м), and the direct object is in the absolutive case (-р).

Sentence	Gloss	Function	Translation
КӀалэм письмэр етхы	Boy-ERG letter-ABS writes	A O VERB	"The boy is writing the letter."
Хьэм тхьакӀумкӀыхьэр къыубытыгъ	Dog-ERG hare-ABS caught	A O VERB	"The dog has caught the hare."

=== Trivalent ditransitive verbs ===
Ditransitive verbs involve three participants: an agent in the ergative case (-м), a theme (direct object) in the absolutive case (-р), and a recipient or goal (indirect object) in the oblique case (-м).

Sentence	Gloss	Function	Translation
КӀалэм мыӀэрысэр пшъашъэм реты	Boy-ERG apple-ABS girl-OBL gives	A O IO VERB	"The boy gives the apple to the girl."
ЛӀым мыжъор хым хедзэ	Man-ERG rock-ABS sea-OBL throws-into	A O IO VERB	"The man throws the rock into the sea."

=== Active and antipassive voice ===
Monovalent intransitive verbs split into two voices. Active intransitive verbs keep the patient/undergoer in the absolutive case, whereas antipassive verbs keep the actor/agent in the absolutive case (the usual object having been dropped). This determines how a verb behaves when its valency increases.

The contrast is visible with the root укъэбзын "to clean":

укъэбзын "to clean"
Voice	Example	Gloss	Translation
Active transitive	КӀалэм унэр еукъэбзы.	Boy-ERG house-ABS cleans	"The boy cleans the house."
Active intransitive	Унэр мэукъэбзы.	House-ABS cleans	"The house becomes clean." (agent dropped)
Antipassive intransitive	КӀалэр мэукъабзэ.	Boy-ABS cleans	"The boy cleans." (object dropped)

The same symmetry appears with тхын "to write", where the antipassive is heavily used even though the active intransitive мэтхы is not used in speech:

тхын "to write"
Voice	Example	Gloss	Translation
Active transitive	КӀалэм гущыӀэр етхы.	Boy-ERG word-ABS writes	"The boy writes the word."
Active intransitive (not used)	ГущыӀэр мэтхы.	Word-ABS writes	"The word is written." (agent dropped)
Antipassive intransitive	КӀалэр матхэ.	Boy-ABS writes	"The boy writes." (object dropped)

The full three-way system is found only in certain dialects; in Standard Adyghe most roots show only two of the three forms.

=== Valency increase ===
Some verbs shift between monovalent, bivalent and trivalent forms without any marking. Valency can also be raised explicitly with the causative affix -гъэ- ("to make, to force"), with prepositional preverbs (e.g. хэ- "into", те- "on"), and with applicative prefixes (benefactive, malefactive, comitative). Because a verb has only one oblique slot, each of these can only be added to a verb whose oblique slot is still free.

The causative fills in the "missing" argument:

Base	Causative	Translation
КӀалэр мачъэ (ABS VERB)	ЛӀым кӀалэр егъачъэ (ERG ABS VERB)	"The boy runs." → "The man makes the boy run."
КӀалэр пшъашъэм еплъы (ABS OBL VERB)	ЛӀым кӀалэр пшъашъэм регъэплъы (ERG ABS OBL VERB)	"The boy looks at the girl." → "The man makes the boy look at the girl."
КӀалэм пшъашъэр елъэгъу (ERG ABS VERB)	ЛӀым пшъашъэр кӀалэм регъэлъэгъу (ERG ABS OBL VERB)	"The boy sees the girl." → "The man makes the boy see the girl."

When the causative applies to a bivalent transitive, the original ergative agent is demoted into the free oblique slot and a new causer enters as the ergative subject.

== Verb conjugation ==
Adyghe, like the other Northwest Caucasian languages, possesses a highly polysynthetic verbal morphology. A single Adyghe verb can simultaneously encode all of its arguments — subject, direct object, and indirect object — through a tightly ordered sequence of personal prefixes attached to the verbal root. These personal prefixes are the backbone of the Adyghe verb, and mastering them is essential to understanding the language.

=== Person markers ===
Adyghe exhibits a strict ergative–absolutive alignment, meaning its arguments are grouped differently from nominative–accusative languages such as English or Russian. There are three core cases, each marked by its own series of personal prefixes:

- Absolutive — the single argument (S) of an intransitive verb and the direct object (P) of a transitive verb both occupy this slot.
- Ergative — the subject (A) of a transitive verb.
- Oblique — indirect objects (recipients, addressees) and the obligatory objects of intransitive bivalent verbs, i.e. verbs that take two arguments but remain formally intransitive (e.g. "to look at", "to listen to", "to wait for").

The exact same person can therefore appear on the verb in up to three different phonetic shapes depending on its syntactic role.

Adyghe personal prefixes
Person	Absolutive	Ergative	Oblique
1SG (I / me)	сы-	с-	сэ-
2SG (you)	у- / п-	бэ- / о-	о-
3SG (he / she / it)	Ø	ы-	е- / ы-
1PL (we / us)	ты-	т-	тэ-
2PL (y'all)	шъу-	шъу-	шъо-
3PL (they / them)	Ø … -х	а-	а-

- (Note: The 3rd person absolutive is always a zero-morpheme (Ø), with plurality indicated by the suffix -х at the end of the verb. In certain present-tense intransitive verbs, a "dynamic" prefix мэ- appears at the front of the verb when the 3rd person is acting, but this is a tense/aspect marker, not a pronoun.)*

Which of the three cases a verb actually uses depends on its valency (how many arguments it takes) and its transitivity. The table below summarises how each verb class maps its arguments onto cases, and therefore how many person markers appear on the verb:

Case alignment by verb class
Verb class	Subject	Direct object	Indirect / oblique object	Person markers
Monovalent intransitive	Absolutive	—	—	1
Bivalent intransitive	Absolutive	—	Oblique	2
Bivalent transitive	Ergative	Absolutive	—	2
Trivalent ditransitive	Ergative	Absolutive	Oblique	3

In other words:

- A monovalent intransitive verb (e.g. плъэн "to look") has a single absolutive argument — its subject — and therefore carries just one person marker.
- A bivalent intransitive verb (e.g. еплъын "to look at") keeps its subject in the absolutive but adds an oblique object; it bears two markers yet remains formally intransitive (the subject is absolutive, not ergative).
- A bivalent transitive verb (e.g. ылъэгъун "to see") has an ergative subject and an absolutive direct object.
- A trivalent ditransitive verb (e.g. тын "to give") has an ergative subject, an absolutive direct object and an oblique indirect object — three markers in all.

The following table takes one concrete verb from each class — in both the present and the past tense — and shows which of the three case slots are filled (and which stay empty), together with the tense suffix that fills the post-root tense slot:

How the case and tense slots are filled in each verb class
Verb class	ABS (slot 1)	OBL (slot 3)	ERG (slot 4)	Tense	Example	Tense suffix (after root)
Monovalent intransitive	сэ-/сы- subject "I"	—	—	Present	Сэплъэ "I look"	— (dynamic э-)
Monovalent intransitive	сэ-/сы- subject "I"	—	—	Past	Сыплъагъ "I looked"	-гъ
Bivalent intransitive	с(ы)- subject "I"	е- object "him"	—	Present	Сеплъы "I look at him"	— (dynamic)
Bivalent intransitive	с(ы)- subject "I"	е- object "him"	—	Past	Сеплъыгъ "I looked at him"	-гъ
Bivalent transitive	у- object "you"	—	сэ-/с- subject "I"	Present	Усэлъэгъу "I see you"	— (dynamic э-)
Bivalent transitive	у- object "you"	—	сэ-/с- subject "I"	Past	Услъэгъугъ "I saw you"	-гъ
Trivalent ditransitive	сы- direct object "me"	у- indirect object "to you"	е- subject "he"	Present	Сыуеты "He gives me to you"	— (dynamic)
Trivalent ditransitive	сы- direct object "me"	у- indirect object "to you"	е- subject "he"	Past	Сыуетыгъ "He gave me to you"	-гъ

(The optional directional slot 2 and the dynamic slot 5 are omitted here for clarity. Notice that the person markers in the case slots are the same in the present and the past — only the tense suffix changes.)

Each of these classes is illustrated and conjugated in the sections that follow.

=== Verb template ===
Every Adyghe verb, regardless of its complexity, is built around an ordered sequence of prefix "slots" preceding the root. Each slot is reserved for a particular grammatical role, and a fundamental rule across all paradigms is that the 3rd person singular Absolutive pronoun ("he/she/it") is a zero-morpheme (∅-). When a slot's argument is 3rd person singular, that slot simply remains empty.

The slots appear in the following fixed order:

Adyghe verb template at a glance
Slot 1	Slot 2	Slot 3	Slot 4	Slot 5	Slot 6	Slot 7
ABS	DIR (къы-/къэ-)	OBL	ERG	DYN (э-/мэ-)	Root	TNS (suffix, e.g. -гъ)

The function of each slot is as follows:

Adyghe verb prefix slots
Slot	Abbreviation	Function
1	ABS	Absolutive — the subject of an intransitive verb or the direct object of a transitive verb
2	DIR	Directional — the cislocative къы-/къэ- ("toward me / toward a reference point"); optional
3	OBL	Oblique / Indirect Object — the indirect or oblique argument
4	ERG	Ergative — the agent (subject) of a transitive verb
5	DYN	Dynamic — the present-tense vowel (э-/мэ-)
6	Root	The verb stem
7	TNS	Tense/aspect suffix following the root (e.g. past -гъ); the present tense carries no suffix and is instead signalled by the dynamic prefix in slot 5

=== Intransitive verbs with an indirect object ===
Using the root -плъы- (to look at):

- Ар сэ къысэплъы (He is looking at me)
  - Breakdown: ∅-къы-с-э-плъ-ы (ABS.3sg – CIS – IO.1sg – DYN – root – PRES)
  - Explanation: Because the 3rd person Absolutive ("He") is a zero-morpheme, slot 1 is empty. The verb outwardly begins with the Cislocative prefix къы- (Slot 2), followed by the 1st person Indirect Object с- ("me" - Slot 3), the dynamic vowel э-, the root, and the present tense suffix.
- Укъысэплъы (You are looking at me)
  - Breakdown: У-къы-с-э-плъ-ы (ABS.2sg – CIS – IO.1sg – DYN – root – PRES)
  - Explanation: Here, the 2nd person Absolutive ("You") is У-. Because it is not a 3rd person pronoun, Slot 1 is visible and occupies the very front of the verb complex.

=== Transitive verbs without an indirect object ===
Using the root -лъэгъу- (to see):

- Сэ ар сэлъэгъу (I see it/him)
  - Breakdown: ∅-с-э-лъэгъу (ABS.3sg – ERG.1sg – DYN – root)
  - Explanation: The Absolutive direct object ("it/him") is 3rd person singular, making Slot 1 invisible. The verb appears to start with the 1st person Ergative agent с- ("I" - Slot 4).
- Усэлъэгъу (I see you)
  - Breakdown: У-с-э-лъэгъу (ABS.2sg – ERG.1sg – DYN – root)
  - Explanation: The Absolutive direct object is 2nd person ("you"), so У- takes its visible place at the front of the verb in Slot 1.

=== Transitive verbs with an indirect object (ditransitive) ===
Using the root -ты- (to give), which allows us to see slots for the direct object (ABS), indirect object (IO), and the agent (ERG) interacting simultaneously:

- Ащ ар сэ къысеты (He gives it to me)
  - Breakdown: ∅-къы-с-е-т-ы (ABS.3sg – CIS – IO.1sg – ERG.3sg – root – PRES)
  - Explanation: The given object ("it") is 3rd person Absolutive (∅-). The verb begins with the Cislocative къы-, indicating the action is directed toward the speaker.
- Укъысеты (He gives you to me)
  - Breakdown: У-къы-с-е-т-ы (ABS.2sg – CIS – IO.1sg – ERG.3sg – root – PRES)
  - Explanation: The given object is now "you" (У-), which becomes visible at the front of the verb.
- Сэ ар о къыосэты (I give it to you)
  - Breakdown: ∅-къы-у-с-э-т-ы (ABS.3sg – CIS – IO.2sg – ERG.1sg – DYN – root – PRES)
  - Explanation: The given object ("it") is 3rd person (∅-). Notice how the 2nd person indirect object (у) and the dynamic vowel (э) fuse phonetically to form the о sound (къы-о-сэты).
- Уесэты (I give you to him)
  - Breakdown: У-е-с-э-т-ы (ABS.2sg – IO.3sg – ERG.1sg – DYN – root – PRES)
  - Explanation: The direct object is "you" (У-). The action is directed away from the speaker (to a 3rd person "him"), so there is no Cislocative prefix (къы-). The 3rd person indirect object is е-.
- Сеоты (You give me to him)
  - Breakdown: С-е-у-э-т-ы (ABS.1sg – IO.3sg – ERG.2sg – DYN – root – PRES)
  - Explanation: The direct object is "me" (С-). The 2nd person Ergative agent (у) and the dynamic vowel (э) fuse to form о (Сеоты).
- Сыуеты (He gives me to you)
  - Breakdown: Сы-у-е-т-ы (ABS.1sg – IO.2sg – ERG.3sg – root – PRES)
  - Explanation: The direct object is "me". Note that the 1st person Absolutive takes the form Сы- here (instead of just С-) to break up the consonant cluster before the 2nd person indirect object у-.

=== Intransitive monovalent conjugation ===
A monovalent intransitive verb has a single argument: its absolutive subject. Because there is no object to agree with, only one personal prefix (from Slot 1) appears on the verb. The conjugation of плъэн /pɬan/ "to look" illustrates this:

Conjugation of monovalent intransitive плъэн (to look) — present and past tense
Free phrase	Present Past	Slot analysis (ABS • CIS • OBL • ERG • Dyn • Root)	Translation
Сэ	Сэплъэ; Сыплъагъ	сэ- • Ø • Ø • Ø • Ø • плъэ сы- • Ø • Ø • Ø • Ø • плъа-гъ	I look I looked
О	Оплъэ; Уплъагъ	о- • Ø • Ø • Ø • Ø • плъэ у- • Ø • Ø • Ø • Ø • плъа-гъ	You look You looked
Ар	Мэплъэ; Плъагъэ	Ø • Ø • Ø • Ø • мэ- • плъэ Ø • Ø • Ø • Ø • Ø • плъа-гъэ	He looks He looked
Тэ	Тэплъэ; Тыплъагъ	тэ- • Ø • Ø • Ø • Ø • плъэ ты- • Ø • Ø • Ø • Ø • плъа-гъ	We look We looked
Шъо	Шъоплъэ; Шъуплъагъ	шъо- • Ø • Ø • Ø • Ø • плъэ шъу- • Ø • Ø • Ø • Ø • плъа-гъ	Y'all look Y'all looked
Ахэр	Мэплъэх; Плъагъэх	Ø • Ø • Ø • Ø • мэ- • плъэ-х Ø • Ø • Ø • Ø • Ø • плъа-гъэ-х	They look They looked

The 3rd person form Мэплъэ "he looks" shows the "dynamic" present-tense prefix мэ-, characteristic of intransitive monovalent verbs. This мэ- is not an agreement marker per se but a tense/aspect indicator; it is regularly dropped in the negative form and non-present tenses.

=== Intransitive bivalent verbs ===
An intransitive bivalent verb takes two arguments: a subject in the absolutive and an object in the oblique. Syntactically the verb is still intransitive — the subject is absolutive, not ergative — but it requires an obligatory oblique argument. The verb еплъын /japɬən/ "to look at" is the canonical example: one looks at someone.

Two prefixes therefore appear before the root in the order dictated by the template:

[Subject (Abs)] – (optional cislocative къы-) – [Object (Obl)] – [Root]

The cislocative къы- adds a sense of "toward me / toward a reference point". It is not, however, equally optional in every cell: its distribution follows the person hierarchy set out just below, and both variants (with and without къы-) are listed for the cells where it is genuinely optional.

==== The directional prefix and the person hierarchy ====
The freedom to add the cislocative къы- tracks a person hierarchy, 1st ≥ 2nd > 3rd. The ranking mirrors how central each person is to the act of speaking: the 1st person (the speaker) is the natural deictic centre, since one normally speaks from one's own point of view; the 2nd person (the addressee) comes next, being present in the conversation and the one spoken to, so the centre readily rests on them; and the 3rd person, absent from the exchange, is the least central. Hence 1st and 2nd sit together at the top (1st ≥ 2nd) and the 3rd trails behind.

"Come" vs. "go". The cislocative къы- is essentially the grammar of "come" (orientation toward the centre); its absence is "go", away from it. English shows the same instinct in its verb choice: one says "I'll come to you", not "I'll go to you", and "you come to me" — movement between speaker and addressee is always "come". Because къы- can attach to any Adyghe verb, this "come/go" contrast surfaces on every verb, not just verbs of motion. An action between 1st and 2nd person — in either direction — therefore behaves like "come" and takes къы-, which is exactly why the two tie (1st ≥ 2nd, not 1st > 2nd). Toward a mere 3rd person English prefers "go" ("I go to him", "you go to him"), and Adyghe likewise leaves 1st/2nd → 3rd bare; but a 3rd person acting back on the speaker or addressee runs toward the centre — "come" — and so takes къы-.

Stated as one rule: the cislocative appears whenever the object stands no lower than the subject on 1st ≥ 2nd > 3rd — the whole 1st↔2nd zone plus every "inverse" cell (3rd→1st, 3rd→2nd, 2nd→1st). In this oblique-object class the effect is semi-mandatory: the bare form is dispreferred there (so 2nd→1st is normally cited only with къы-, Укъысэплъы "you look at me"), while the outbound cells (1st/2nd → 3rd, and a 3rd person on a distinct 3rd) stay bare by default.

The cislocative (CISL) and the hierarchy 1st ≥ 2nd > 3rd in the bivalent intransitive
Subject ↓	Object →		
Subject ↓	1st	2nd	3rd
1st	—	+CISL	−CISL
2nd	+CISL	—	−CISL
3rd	+CISL	+CISL	−CISL

+CISL (red) = the cislocative is (semi-)obligatory (the "come" cells); −CISL (yellow) = the plain outbound form, no къы- (the "go" cells). The 1st→1st and 2nd→2nd cells are greyed because a speaker or addressee acting on itself is reflexive (built separately with зэ-/зы- + -жьы); a 3rd person acting on a distinct 3rd ("he looks at him") is the ordinary direct form and stays bare. Kabardian fills the 1st→2nd cell with the translocative н(ы)- instead.

Adyghe uses the same cislocative къы- in both directions of the 1st↔2nd zone (Сыкъыоплъы "I look at you", Укъысэплъы "you look at me"). Kabardian differs only here: it keeps the cislocative for the inbound 2nd→1st but marks the outbound 1st→2nd with the mirror-image translocative н(ы)- (Сыноплъ "I look at you").

Because this is orientation, not rigid agreement, a speaker can override it to shift the centre onto a 3rd person: adding къы- to an otherwise outbound form recentres the scene on that 3rd party. Thus beside the default Сеплъыгъ "I looked at him" one finds К1элэц1ык1ум сыкъеплъыгъ "I looked at the little boy" (e.g. to check whether he was asleep), where къы- pulls the centre onto the child. Such recentrings are possible on any verb but are marked; the unmarked default remains 1st ≥ 2nd > 3rd.

==== Present ====
Conjugation of еплъын (to look at)
Subject (Abs)	Object (Oblique)						
Subject (Abs)	At me	At you	At him	At us	At y'all	At them	At oneself
I		Сыоплъы; Сыкъыоплъы {I look at you}	Сеплъы; Сыкъеплъы {I look at him}		Сышъоплъы; Сыкъышъоплъы {I look at y'all}	Саплъы; Сыкъаплъы {I look at them}	Сызэплъыжьы; Сыкъызэплъыжьы {I look at myself}
You	Укъысэплъы {You look at me}		Уеплъы; Укъеплъы {You look at him}	Укъытэплъы {You look at us}		Уаплъы; Укъаплъы {You look at them}	Узэплъыжьы; Укъызэплъыжьы {You look at yourself}
He	Къысэплъы {He looks at me}	Къыоплъы {He looks at you}	Еплъы; Къеплъы {He looks at him}	Къытэплъы {He looks at us}	Къышъоплъы {He looks at y'all}	Аплъы; Къаплъы {He looks at them}	Зэплъыжьы; Къызэплъыжьы {He looks at himself}
We		Тыоплъы; Тыкъыоплъы {We look at you}	Теплъы; Тыкъеплъы {We look at him}		Тышъоплъы; Тыкъышъоплъы {We look at y'all}	Таплъы; Тыкъаплъы {We look at them}	Тызэплъыжьы; Тыкъызэплъыжьы {We look at ourselves}
Y'all	Шъукъысэплъы {Y'all look at me}		Шъуеплъы; Шъукъеплъы {Y'all look at him}	Шъукъытэплъы {Y'all look at us}		Шъуаплъы; Шъукъаплъы {Y'all look at them}	Шъузэплъыжьы; Шъукъызэплъыжьы {Y'all look at yourselves}
They	Къысэплъых {They look at me}	Къыоплъых {They look at you}	Еплъых; Къеплъых {They look at him}	Къытэплъых {They look at us}	Къышъоплъых {They look at y'all}	Аплъых; Къаплъых {They look at them}	Зэплъыжьых; Къызэплъыжьых {They look at themselves}

==== Past ====
The past tense of an intransitive bivalent verb is formed by replacing the present-tense suffix with -гъ (or -гъэ-…-х in the 3rd person plural). Crucially, the person-marking prefixes themselves remain unchanged — only the tense suffix shifts.

Compare:

- Present: Сеплъы "I look at him"
- Past: Сеплъыгъ "I looked at him"

Conjugation of еплъыгъ (looked at)
Subject (Abs)	Object (Oblique)						
Subject (Abs)	At me	At you	At him	At us	At y'all	At them	At oneself
I		Сыоплъыгъ; Скъыоплъыгъ {I looked at you}	Сеплъыгъ; Скъеплъыгъ {I looked at him}		Сышъоплъыгъ; Скъышъоплъыгъ {I looked at y'all}	Саплъыгъ; Скъаплъыгъ {I looked at them}	Сызэплъыжьыгъ; Сыкъызэплъыжьыгъ {I looked at myself}
You	Укъысэплъыгъ {You looked at me}		Уеплъыгъ; Укъеплъыгъ {You looked at him}	Укъытэплъыгъ {You looked at us}		Уаплъыгъ; Укъаплъыгъ {You looked at them}	Узэплъыжьыгъ; Укъызэплъыжьыгъ {You looked at yourself}
He	Къысэплъыгъ {He looked at me}	Къыоплъыгъ {He looked at you}	Еплъыгъ; Къеплъыгъ {He looked at him}	Къытэплъыгъ {He looked at us}	Къышъоплъыгъ {He looked at y'all}	Аплъыгъ; Къаплъыгъ {He looked at them}	Зэплъыжьыгъ; Къызэплъыжьыгъ {He looked at himself}
We		Тыоплъыгъ; Ткъыоплъыгъ {We looked at you}	Теплъыгъ; Ткъеплъыгъ {We looked at him}		Тышъоплъыгъ; Ткъышъоплъыгъ {We looked at y'all}	Таплъыгъ; Ткъаплъыгъ {We looked at them}	Тызэплъыжьыгъ; Тыкъызэплъыжьыгъ {We looked at ourselves}
Y'all	Шъукъысэплъыгъ {Y'all looked at me}		Шъуеплъыгъ; Шъукъеплъыгъ {Y'all looked at him}	Шъукъытэплъыгъ {Y'all looked at us}		Шъуаплъыгъ; Шъукъаплъыгъ {Y'all looked at them}	Шъузэплъыжьыгъ; Шъукъызэплъыжьыгъ {Y'all looked at yourselves}
They	Къысэплъыгъэх {They looked at me}	Къыоплъыгъэх {They looked at you}	Еплъыгъэх; Къеплъыгъэх {They looked at him}	Къытэплъыгъэх {They looked at us}	Къышъоплъыгъэх {They looked at y'all}	Аплъыгъэх; Къаплъыгъэх {They looked at them}	Зэплъыжьыгъэх; Къызэплъыжьыгъэх {They looked at themselves}

=== Transitive bivalent verbs ===
==== Present ====
A transitive bivalent verb takes two arguments that are both treated as "core" arguments: an ergative subject (the agent) and an absolutive direct object (the patient). The verb ылъэгъун /əɬaʁʷən/ "to see" is of this type: someone sees someone (or something).

Because the subject is now ergative and the object absolutive, the order of prefixes in the template is:

[Object (Abs)] – (optional cislocative къэ-) – [Subject (Erg)] – [Root]

Here the object is absolutive (a core argument, not an oblique), so the hierarchy 1st ≥ 2nd > 3rd has a weaker grip: it is more optional than in the semi-mandatory intransitive, showing no inverse gap. The cislocative къэ- stays optional in every cell, inverse ones included (Селъэгъу ~ Скъелъэгъу "he sees me").

Conjugation of ылъэгъун (to see)
Subject (Erg)	Object (Abs)						
Subject (Erg)	Me	You	Him/It	Us	Y'all	Them	Oneself
I		Усэлъэгъу; Укъэсэлъэгъу {I see you}	Сэлъэгъу; Къэсэлъэгъу {I see him}		Шъусэлъэгъу; Шъукъэсэлъэгъу {I see y'all}	Сэлъэгъух; Къэсэлъэгъух {I see them}	Зэсэлъэгъужьы; Зкъэсэлъэгъужьы {I see myself}
You	Сыолъэгъу; Скъэолъэгъу {You see me}		Улъэгъу; Къэолъэгъу {You see him}	Тыолъэгъу; Ткъэолъэгъу {You see us}		улъэгъух Къэолъэгъух {You see them}	Зэолъэгъужьы; Зкъэолъэгъужьы {You see yourself}
He	Селъэгъу; Скъелъэгъу {He sees me}	Уелъэгъу; Укъелъэгъу {He sees you}	Елъэгъу; Къелъэгъу {He sees him}	Телъэгъу; Ткъелъэгъу {He sees us}	Шъуелъэгъу; Шъукъелъэгъу {He sees y'all}	Елъэгъух; Къелъэгъух {He sees them}	Зелъэгъужьы; Зыкъелъэгъужьы {He sees himself}
We		Отэлъэгъу; Укъэтэлъэгъу {We see you}	Тылъэгъу; Къэтэлъэгъу {We see him}		Шъутэлъэгъу; Шъукъэтэлъэгъу {We see y'all}	Тылъэгъух; Къэтэлъэгъух {We see them}	Зэтэлъэгъужьы; Зкъэтэлъэгъужьы {We see ourselves}
Y'all	Сышъолъэгъу; Скъэшъолъэгъу {Y'all see me}		Шъулъэгъу; Къэшъолъэгъу {Y'all see him}	Тышъолъэгъу; Ткъэшъолъэгъу {Y'all see us}		Шъулъэгъух; Къэшъолъэгъух {Y'all see them}	Зэшъолъэгъужьы; Зкъэшъолъэгъужьы {Y'all see yourselves}
They	Салъэгъу; Скъалъэгъу {They see me}	Уалъэгъу; Укъалъэгъу {They see you}	Алъэгъу; Къалъэгъу {They see him}	Талъэгъу; Ткъалъэгъу {They see us}	Шъуалъэгъу; Шъукъалъэгъу {They see y'all}	Алъэгъух; Къалъэгъух {They see them}	Залъэгъужьы; Зыкъалъэгъужьы {They see themselves}

Points worth noting:

- The 3SG absolutive (the direct object "him/it") is zero-marked. Thus Сэлъэгъу "I see (him)" contains no overt patient prefix.
- A cislocative variant with къэ- is available for many cells (e.g. Къэсэлъэгъу "I see him [toward me]"), often with a nuance of "I can see him / I catch sight of him".
- The reflexive is built with зэ- plus the re-/back suffix -жьы.

Note on dialectal variation. In the official Adyghe literary language, the 2SG ergative prefix (Subject "You") is strictly -о-. However, many other Circassian dialects allow both -о- and -бэ-. The form -бэ- is an exception in that it cannot start a verb; it is only allowed word-medially (e.g. when preceded by another prefix such as an object or directional marker). Examples of this dialectal variation:

- Сэолъэгъу (Standard) = Сэбэлъэгъу (Dialectal)
- Къэолъэгъух (Standard) = Къэбэлъэгъух (Dialectal)

==== Past ====
The past tense of transitive verbs is formed with the suffix -гъ (or -гъ(эх) in the 3PL), just as in intransitive verbs.

Conjugation of лъэгъугъ (saw)
Subject (Erg / Obl)	Object (Abs)						
Subject (Erg / Obl)	Me	You	Him	Us	Y'all	Them	Oneself
I		Услъэгъугъ; Укъэслъэгъугъ {I saw you}	Слъэгъугъ; Къыслъэгъугъ {I saw him}		Шъуслъэгъугъ; Шъукъэслъэгъугъ {I saw y'all}	Слъэгъугъх; Къыслъэгъугъх {I saw them}	Зыслъэгъужьыгъ {I saw myself}
You	Сыплъэгъугъ; Скъыплъэгъугъ {You saw me}		Плъэгъугъ; Къыплъэгъугъ; Улъэгъугъ {You saw him}	Тыплъэгъугъ; Ткъыплъэгъугъ {You saw us}		Плъэгъугъх; Къыплъэгъугъх; Улъэгъугъх {You saw them}	Зыплъэгъужьыгъ {You saw yourself}
He	Сылъэгъугъ; Скъылъэгъугъ {He saw me}	Плъэгъугъ; Улъэгъугъ; Укъылъэгъугъ {He saw you}	Ылъэгъугъ; Къылъэгъугъ {He saw him}	Тылъэгъугъ; Ткъылъэгъугъ {He saw us}	Шъулъэгъугъ; Шъукъылъэгъугъ {He saw y'all}	Ылъэгъугъэх; Къылъэгъугъэх {He saw them}	Зилъэгъужьыгъ {He saw himself}
We		Утлъэгъугъ; Укъытлъэгъугъ {We saw you}	Тлъэгъугъ; Къытлъэгъугъ {We saw him}		Шъутлъэгъугъ; Шъукъытлъэгъугъ {We saw y'all}	Тлъэгъугъх; Къытлъэгъугъх {We saw them}	Зытлъэгъужьыгъ {We saw ourselves}
Y'all	Сышъулъэгъугъ; Сыкъышъулъэгъугъ {Y'all saw me}		Шъулъэгъугъ; Къышъулъэгъугъ {Y'all saw him}	Тышъулъэгъугъ; Тыкъышъулъэгъугъ {Y'all saw us}		Шъулъэгъугъх; Къышъулъэгъугъх {Y'all saw them}	Зышъулъэгъужьыгъ {Y'all saw yourselves}
They	Салъэгъугъ; Скъалъэгъугъ {They saw me}	Уалъэгъугъ; Укъалъэгъугъ {They saw you}	Алъэгъугъ; Къалъэгъугъ {They saw him}	Талъэгъугъ; Ткъалъэгъугъ {They saw us}	Шъуалъэгъугъ; Шъукъалъэгъугъ {They saw y'all}	Алъэгъугъэх; Къалъэгъугъэх {They saw them}	Залъэгъужьыгъ {They saw themselves}

== Dynamic and stative verbs ==
Adyghe verbs are categorized into two main aspectual classes: dynamic and stative (also called static or steady-state). This distinction is fundamental to Circassian grammar, as it influences verb conjugation and the prefixes used.

- Dynamic verbs express actions, processes, or changes in state. They describe what the subject is doing.
- Stative verbs express a condition, a state of being, a result of an action, or a quality. They describe what the subject is or has.

=== Comparison ===
To understand the difference, consider the concept of "standing":

- Stative: щыт [ɕət] — "(s)he is standing" (maintaining the state).
- Dynamic: къэтэджын [qatad͡ʒən] — "to stand up" (the process of rising from a sitting/lying position).

=== Dynamic verbs ===
Dynamic verbs typically use the dynamic prefixes (such as мэ- /ma/ in the 3rd person or сэ- /sa/ in the 1st person) in the present tense.

Type	Adyghe	IPA	Translation
Motion	ар макӀо	/maːkʷʼa/	(s)he is going
Motion	сэ сэчъэ	/sat͡ʂa/	I am running
Motion	сэ сэцӀэнлъэ	/sat͡sʼanɬa/	I am crawling
Motion	сэ сэлъэгъу	/saɬaʁʷə/	I am seeing
Action	ар еджэ	/jad͡ʒa/	(s)he is reading it
Action	сэ сэӀо	/saʔʷa/	I am saying
Action	ащ еукӀы	/jawət͡ʃʼə/	(s)he is killing it
Action	ар мэчъые	/mat͡ʂəja/	(s)he is sleeping

=== Stative verbs ===
Stative verbs usually mark the subject with absolutive prefixes (сы- /sə/ for 1st person, у- /wə/ for 2nd person, and zero marking for 3rd person). Nouns indicating a profession or role can also function as stative verbs.

Type	Adyghe	IPA	Translation
Positional	ар щыс	/ɕəs/	(s)he is sitting
Positional	сэ сыщыт	/səɕət/	I am standing
Positional	сэ сыщылъ	/səɕəɬ/	I am lying down
Existence/State	ар щыӀ	/ɕəʔ/	(s)he exists / is present
Existence/State	ащ иӀ	/jəʔ/	(s)he has (possession)
Existence/State	ар фай	/faːj/	(s)he wants
ащ икӀас	/jət͡ʃʼaːs/	(s)he likes	
Equational (Nouns as verbs)	сэ сыпхъашӀ	/səpχaːʃʼ/	I am a carpenter
Equational (Nouns as verbs)	ар цӀыф	/t͡sʼəf/	(s)he is a person

==== Conjugation of stative verbs ====
Below is the present tense conjugation for the stative verb щысын "to be sitting". Note the subject prefixes used.

Number	Person	Prefix	Adyghe	IPA	Translation
Singular	1st	сы~	сыщыс	/səɕəs/	I am sitting
Singular	2nd	у~	ущыс	/wəɕəs/	You are sitting
Singular	3rd	(null)	щыс	/ɕəs/	(S)he is sitting
Plural	1st	ты~	тыщыс	/təɕəs/	We are sitting
Plural	2nd	шъу~	шъущыс	/ʃʷəɕəs/	You (pl) are sitting
Plural	3rd	~х	щысх	/ɕəsx/	They are sitting

==== Spatial stative examples ====
Positional stative verbs often take locative prefixes to indicate relative position (inside, on, near).

КӀалэр чъыгым Ӏулъ
КӀалэ-р чъыгы-м Ӏу-лъ
t͡ʃʼaːɮar t͡ʂəɣəm ʔʷəɬ
boy-ABS tree-ERG {lies near}
"The boy is lying near the tree."

КӀалэр пхъэнтӀэкӀум тес
КӀалэ-р пхъэнтӀэкӀу-м те-с
t͡ʃʼaːɮar pχantʼakʷʼəm tajs
boy-ABS chair-ERG {sits on}
"The boy is sitting on the chair."

КӀалэр унэм ис
КӀалэ-р унэ-м и-с
t͡ʃʼaːɮar wənam jəs
boy-ABS house-ERG {sits inside}
"The boy is sitting inside the house."

=== Masdar ===
Masdar (similar to gerund) is formed by adding the suffix -н (-n).

тхы-н "writing",
чъэ-н "running".

ар тхэн дах
ар тхэ-н дах
[aːr txan daːx]
that.ABS {writing (Masdar)} beautiful
"That is a beautiful writing"

Masdar has grammatical cases:

Absolutive чъэны-р
Ergative чъэны-м
Instrumental чъэны-м-кӀэ
Adverbial чъэн-эу

университетэм ущеджэныр къины
университет-эм ущеджэ-н-ыр къины
[ʊnɪvɪrsɪˈtetam ɕajd͡ʒanər qəjnə]
university.ERG {studying in (Masdar)} hard
"Studying in the university is hard."

== Participle ==
Adyghe has a rich participle morphology. Participles are verb forms that function as nouns or noun modifiers, referring to one of the verb's arguments (subject, object, indirect object) or to circumstances of the action (time, place, manner, reason).

Participles in Adyghe are formed by adding noun case markers (Absolutive -р, Oblique/Ergative -м, Instrumental -кӀэ, Adverbial -эу) directly to the verb form. This turns the verb into a noun or adjective (e.g., "the one who walks," "the sitting one").

Because Adyghe is an ergative–absolutive language, the transitivity of the verb is the main factor determining the choice of the subject case. Participles can take different cases depending on their role in the matrix sentence. For example, two participles can interact in a single sentence as subject and object:

КӀорэм	ылъэгъугъ	моу	щычъыягъэр
кӀо-рэ-м	ы-лъэгъу-гъ	моу	щы-чъые-агъ-эр
go-DYN-ERG	3SG.ERG-see-PST	here	LOC-sleep-PST-ABS
"The one who is going saw the one that slept here."

=== Valency and arguments ===
To understand Adyghe participles, it is essential to first understand the valency of the verb (the number of arguments it takes) and the grammatical case of each argument:

- Monovalent intransitive verbs have only one argument: an absolutive subject.
- Bivalent intransitive verbs have two arguments: an absolutive subject and an oblique object.
- Bivalent transitive verbs have two arguments: an ergative subject and an absolutive object.
- Trivalent transitive verbs have three arguments: an ergative subject, an absolutive direct object, and an oblique indirect object.

Verb type	Example sentence	Gloss
Monovalent intransitive	КӀалэр макӀо	Boy-ABS goes — "The boy goes"
Bivalent intransitive	КӀалэр тхылъым еджэ	Boy-ABS book-OBL reads — "The boy reads the book"
Bivalent transitive	КӀалэм тхылъыр елъэгъу	Boy-ERG book-ABS sees — "The boy sees the book"
Trivalent transitive	КӀалэм пшъашъэм тхылъыр ритыгъ	Boy-ERG girl-OBL book-ABS gave — "The boy gave the book to the girl"

=== The dynamic suffix -рэ ===
The suffix -рэ is a marker of dynamic action inherited from Proto-Circassian (reconstructed as *-ra). In Modern Adyghe, this suffix is generally dropped in the standard present tense affirmative (e.g., макӀо) because it is not followed by any other suffix. However, it reappears when followed by another suffix, such as a negative marker (e.g., кӀорэп) or a case marker. Therefore, it is always visible in present tense dynamic participles.

==== Dynamic verbs (present tense) ====
Dynamic verbs (actions) always retain the suffix -рэ in the present tense participle because the case marker follows it.

Verb form	Participle	Breakdown	Gloss	Translation
МакӀо	КӀорэр	кӀо-рэ-р	go-DYN-ABS	"The one who is going."
Еплъы	Еплъырэр	е-плъы-рэ-р	DAT-look-DYN-ABS	"The one looking at it."

==== Static verbs (present tense) ====
For static verbs (states), there is a crucial distinction based on whether the suffix -рэ is used:

- No suffix: Describes a current state (someone is doing it right now).
- With -рэ: Describes a habitual or frequentative action (someone usually/often does it).

Nuance	Verb root	Participle	Breakdown	Translation
Current State (Right now)	Щыс	Щысыр	щыс-ыр	"The one who is sitting."
Current State (Right now)	Ӏулъ	Ӏулъым	Ӏулъы-м	"(to) The one who is lying near."
Habitual (Usually/Often)	Щыс	Щысырэр	щыс-рэ-р	"The one who usually sits."
Habitual (Usually/Often)	Ӏулъ	Ӏулъырэм	Ӏулъы-рэ-м	"(to) The one who usually lies near."

==== Past & future tenses ====
In the past and future tenses, participles for both dynamic and static verbs are formed identically: the case marker is added directly to the tense suffix. The dynamic suffix -рэ is not used.

Tense	Verb form	Participle	Breakdown	Gloss	Translation
Past	Еплъыгъ	ЕплъыгъэмкӀэ	е-плъы-гъэ-мкӀэ	DAT-look-PST-INS	"Using the one who looked at it."
Past	Ылъэгъугъ	Ылъэгъугъэм	ы-лъэгъу-гъэ-м	3SG.ERG-see-PST-OBL	"(to) The one who saw it."
Future	Естышъущт	Естышъущтыр	е-сты-шъу-щты-р	DAT-give-POT-FUT-ABS	"The thing I can give to him"

=== Argument participles ===
Any argument of a verb can become the pivot of a participle. The grammatical role of the participle is determined by its morphology:

- The base form of the participle (no prefix) refers to the absolutive argument — i.e., the subject of an intransitive verb or the direct object of a transitive verb.
- The prefix зы- (or з- before a vowel) marks the ergative or oblique argument — i.e., the subject of a transitive verb, or an object marked by a preverb.

Participles themselves can take case endings: -р (absolutive) and -м (oblique/ergative), depending on the role the participle plays in the larger sentence.

To summarize how the prefix зы- interacts with transitivity to indicate the referent:

Prefix	Intransitive verbs	Transitive verbs
(Base / No prefix)	Absolutive Subject (the one who does)	Absolutive Object (the thing being acted upon)
зы- (or з-)	Oblique Object (the thing being interacted with)	Ergative Subject (the one who performs the action)

==== Monovalent intransitive verbs ====
The sole argument (the absolutive subject) is referenced by the base participle.

Verb	Participle	Meaning
кӀон "to go"	кӀорэр / кӀорэм (present) кӀуагъэр / кӀуагъэм (past)	"the one who goes" / "the one who went"
чъэн "to run"	чъэрэр / чъэрэм (present) чъагъэр / чъагъэм (past)	"the one who runs" / "the one who ran"

Sentence	Gloss	Translation
КӀалэр макӀо	Boy-ABS goes	"The boy goes."
КӀорэр кӀалэр ары	Goer is-boy	"The one who goes is the boy."
КӀалэр кӀуагъ	Boy-ABS went	"The boy went."
КӀуагъэр кӀалэр ары	Gone.one is-boy	"The one who went is the boy."
КӀалэр мачъэ	Boy-ABS runs	"The boy runs."
Чъэрэр кӀалэр ары	Runner is-boy	"The one who runs is the boy."
КӀалэр чъагъэ	Boy-ABS ran	"The boy ran."
Чъагъэр кӀалэр ары	Ran.one is-boy	"The one who ran is the boy."

==== Bivalent intransitive verbs ====
These verbs have an absolutive subject and an oblique object. Both arguments can be expressed as participles, distinguished by the absence or presence of зы-.

Verb	Absolutive participle	Oblique participle (зы-)
еджэн "to read (something)"	еджэрэр / еджэрэм (pres.) еджагъэр / еджагъэм (past) "the one who reads"	зэджэрэр / зэджэрэм (pres.) зэджагъэр / зэджагъэм (past) "the thing that is being read"
еплъын "to look at (something)"	еплъырэр / еплъырэм (pres.) еплъыгъэр / еплъыгъэм (past) "the one who looks at it"	зэплъырэр / зэплъырэм (pres.) зэплъыгъэр / зэплъыгъэм (past) "the thing that is being looked at"
дэгущыӀэн "to speak with (someone)"	дэгущыӀэрэр / дэгущыӀэрэм (pres.) "the one who is speaking"	здэгущыӀэрэр / здэгущыӀэрэм (pres.) "the one they are speaking with"

Sentence	Gloss	Translation
КӀалэр тхылъым еджэ	Boy-ABS book-OBL reads	"The boy reads the book."
Еджэрэр кӀалэр ары	Reader is-boy	"The one who reads is the boy." (absolutive subject)
Зэджэрэр тхылъыр ары	That-which-is-read is-book	"The thing being read is the book." (oblique object)
КӀалэр тхылъым еджагъ	Boy-ABS book-OBL read	"The boy read the book."
Еджагъэр кӀалэр ары	Reader is-boy	"The one who read is the boy."
Зэджагъэр тхылъыр ары	That-which-was-read is-book	"The thing that was read is the book."
КӀалэр сурэтым еплъы	Boy-ABS picture-OBL looks.at	"The boy looks at the picture."
Еплъырэр кӀалэр ары	Looker is-boy	"The one who looks is the boy."
Зэплъырэр сурэтыр ары	That-which-is-looked.at is-picture	"The thing being looked at is the picture."
КӀалэр сурэтым еплъыгъ	Boy-ABS picture-OBL looked.at	"The boy looked at the picture."
Еплъыгъэр кӀалэр ары	Looker is-boy	"The one who looked is the boy."
Зэплъыгъэр сурэтыр ары	That-which-was-looked.at is-picture	"The thing looked at is the picture."

==== Bivalent transitive verbs ====
These verbs have an ergative subject and an absolutive object. The base form refers to the absolutive (the object being acted upon), while зы- marks the ergative (the one performing the action).

Verb	Absolutive participle	Ergative participle (зы-)
лъэгъун "to see (something)"	ылъэгъурэр / ылъэгъурэм (pres.) ылъэгъугъэр / ылъэгъугъэм (past) "the one being seen"	зылъэгъурэр / зылъэгъурэм (pres.) зылъэгъугъэр / зылъэгъугъэм (past) "the one who sees it"
щэн "to lead (someone)"	ыщэрэр / ыщэрэм (pres.) ыщагъэр / ыщагъэм (past) "the one being led"	зыщэрэр / зыщэрэм (pres.) зыщагъэр / зыщагъэм (past) "the one who leads"
шхын "to eat (something)"	ышхырэр / ышхырэм (pres.) "the thing being eaten"	зышхырэр / зышхырэм (pres.) "the one who eats it"
дзын "to throw (something)"	ыдзырэр / ыдзырэм (pres.) "the thing being thrown"	зыдзырэр / зыдзырэм (pres.) "the one who throws it"

Sentence	Gloss	Translation
КӀалэм пшъашъэр елъэгъу	Boy-ERG girl-ABS sees	"The boy sees the girl."
Ылъэгъурэр пшъашъэр ары	That-which-is-seen is-girl	"The one being seen is the girl." (absolutive object)
Зылъэгъурэр кӀалэр ары	Seer is-boy	"The one who sees is the boy." (ergative subject)
КӀалэм пшъашъэр ылъэгъугъ	Boy-ERG girl-ABS saw	"The boy saw the girl."
Ылъэгъугъэр пшъашъэр ары	That-which-was-seen is-girl	"The one who was seen is the girl."
Зылъэгъугъэр кӀалэр ары	Seer is-boy	"The one who saw is the boy."
ЛӀым шыр ещэ	Man-ERG horse-ABS leads	"The man leads the horse."
Ыщэрэр шыр ары	That-which-is-led is-horse	"The one being led is the horse."
Зыщэрэр лӀыр ары	Leader is-man	"The one who leads is the man."
ЛӀым шыр ыщагъ	Man-ERG horse-ABS led	"The man led the horse."
Ыщагъэр шыр ары	That-which-was-led is-horse	"The one that was led is the horse."
Зыщагъэр лӀыр ары	Leader is-man	"The one who led is the man."

==== Trivalent transitive verbs ====
These verbs have an ergative subject, an absolutive direct object, and an oblique indirect object.

- Absolutive referent: Refers to the item being given or told. It uses the standard relational prefix р- (or я-).
- Ergative/Oblique referent: Refers to either the giver or the recipient. It uses the relative prefix зы-.

Because зы- targets any non-absolutive argument, the resulting participle is formally ambiguous in isolation. The specific meaning ("the giver" vs. "the recipient") is determined by context or by which noun carries the adverbial case.

Verb	Absolutive participle (the "gift")	Ergative/Oblique participle (the "actor/recipient")
етын "to give"	ритырэр / ритырэм (pres.) ритыгъэр / ритыгъэм (past) "the thing being given"	зритырэр / зритырэм (pres.) зритыгъэр / зритыгъэм (past) "the one who gives" OR "the recipient"
Ӏон "to say"	риӀорэр / риӀорэм (pres.) риӀуагъэр / риӀуагъэм (past) "that which is said"	зыриӀорэр / зыриӀорэм (pres.) зыриӀуагъэр / зыриӀуагъэм (past) "the one who says" OR "the listener"

Sentence	Gloss	Translation
КӀалэм пшъашъэм тхылъыр реты	Boy-ERG girl-OBL book-ABS gives	"The boy gives the book to the girl."
Ритырэр тхылъыр ары	That-which-is-given is-book	"The thing being given is the book." (absolutive)
Зритырэр кӀалэр ары	Giver/Recipient is-boy	"The one who gives is the boy." (ergative)
Зритырэр пшъашъэр ары	Giver/Recipient is-girl	"The one to whom it is given is the girl." (oblique)
КӀалэм пшъашъэм тхылъыр ритыгъ	Boy-ERG girl-OBL book-ABS gave	"The boy gave the book to the girl."
Ритыгъэр тхылъыр ары	That-which-was-given is-book	"The thing given was the book." (absolutive)
Зритыгъэр кӀалэр ары	Giver/Recipient is-boy	"The one who gave is the boy." (ergative)
Зритыгъэр пшъашъэр ары	Giver/Recipient is-girl	"The one to whom it was given is the girl." (oblique)
КӀалэм пшъашъэм гущыӀэ дэгъур реӀо	Boy-ERG girl-OBL nice-word-ABS says	"The boy says a nice word to the girl."
РиӀорэр гущыӀэ дэгъур ары	That-which-is-said is-nice-word	"What is being said is a nice word." (absolutive)
ЗыриӀорэр кӀалэр ары	Sayer/Listener is-boy	"The one who says it is the boy." (ergative)
ЗыриӀорэр пшъашъэр ары	Sayer/Listener is-girl	"The one to whom it is said is the girl." (oblique)

=== Specifying the referent with the adverbial case -у ===
When a participle stands alone, it refers generically to "the one who…" or "that which…". To specify exactly what or who the participle refers to, the relevant noun is marked with the adverbial case -у. The participle then acts as a relative clause modifying that noun.

The key insight is: the noun marked with -у is the referent of the participle. Because only one noun in the clause carries -у, there is no ambiguity about which noun the participle describes. Note how the participle inherits the case needed for the wider sentence structure.

Sentence	Translation
КӀалэу макӀорэр дахэ	"The boy that is going is beautiful."
КӀалэу еджэрэр дахэ	"The boy that is reading is beautiful."
КӀалэу тхылъым еджэрэр дахэ	"The boy that reads the book is beautiful."
КӀалэр тхылъэу зеджэрэр дахэ	"The book that the boy reads is beautiful."
КӀалэр тхылъэу зеджэрэм еплъ	"Look at the book the boy is reading."
Пшъашъэу кӀалэм ылъэгъугъэр дахэ	"The girl the boy saw is beautiful."
КӀалэу пшъашъэр зылъэгъугъэр дахэ	"The boy that saw the girl is beautiful."
Тары цӀыфэу уукӀыгъагъэр?	"Which person is the one you killed?"

=== Circumstantial participles ===
In addition to argument participles, Adyghe has participles that refer to circumstances of the action rather than to its arguments. These are formed by adding specific prefixes to the verb.

==== Temporal participle зы- ====
Marked by зы- (often with the oblique case ending -м), this participle denotes the time at which an action takes place.

Sentence	Translation
Ар зылажьэрэр унэр ары	"Where he works is (at) home."
УкъызэкӀожьым сэ унэм сыщыӀагъэп	"I wasn't home when you arrived."
Сшыпхъур къызэхъум сэ илъэсиблырэ сыхъугъагъ	"When my sister was born, I was already seven years old."
Сызелъэгъум, ар чъагъэ	"When he saw me, he ran away."

==== Locative participle зыдэ- ====
Marked by зыдэ-, this participle denotes the place at which an action occurs.

Sentence	Translation
Сэ зыдэсыпсэурэр Мыекъуапэ ары	"Where I live is Maykop."
Ар зыдэлэжьагъэр заводыр ары	"Where he worked is the factory."

==== Manner participle зэрэ- ====
Marked by зэрэ-, this participle denotes the manner in which an action is performed.

Sentence	Translation
Ащ зэрэгущыӀэрэр дахэ	"The way he speaks is beautiful."
Ащ зэрилэжьагъэр тшӀэрэп	"We don't know how he did it."

==== Reason participle зыкӀэ- ====
Marked by зыкӀэ-, this participle denotes the reason for which an action is performed.

Sentence	Translation
Ар зыкӀэлажьэрэр иунагъор ары	"The reason he works is his family."
Ар зыкӀэкӀуагъэр ныбджэгъур ары	"The reason he went was a friend."

== Negative form ==
In the Adyghe language, the negative form of a verb is expressed through different morphemes (prefixes and suffixes) depending on the mood, tense, and form of the verb.

=== The suffix -эп (indicative statements) ===
In finite verbs, the negative meaning is typically expressed with the suffix -эп. This suffix is attached at the end of the verb, usually following the tense suffixes. It is primarily used to negate standard declarative statements.

Below is a table demonstrating the negative conjugation of five verbs—тэджын (to get up), кIон (to go), лъэгъун (to see), плъэн (to look), and къыгурыIон (to understand)—in the first and third persons across the present, past, and future tenses:

Verb (Infinitive)	Person	Present	Past	Future
тэджын (to get up)	1st Person	сытэджырэп	сытэджыгъэп	сытэджыщтэп
тэджын (to get up)	3rd Person	тэджырэп	тэджыгъэп	тэджыщтэп
кIон (to go)	1st Person	сыкIорэп	сыкIуагъэп	сыкIощтэп
кIон (to go)	3rd Person	кIорэп	кIуагъэп	кIощтэп
лъэгъун (to see)	1st Person	слъэгъурэп	слъэгъугъэп	слъэгъущтэп
лъэгъун (to see)	3rd Person	ылъэгъурэп	ылъэгъугъэп	ылъэгъущтэп
плъэн (to look)	1st Person	сыплъэрэп	сыплъагъэп	сыплъэщтэп
плъэн (to look)	3rd Person	плъэрэп	плъагъэп	плъэщтэп
къыгурыIон (to understand)	1st Person	къызгурыIорэп	къызгурыIуагъэп	къызгурыIощтэп
къыгурыIон (to understand)	3rd Person	къыгурыIорэп	къыгурыIогъэп	къыгурыIощтэп

=== The prefix -мы- (commands, conditionals, and participles) ===
In participles, adverbial participles, masdars, imperatives (commands), interrogatives, and other dependent verb forms, negation is expressed with the prefix -мы-. This prefix usually attaches directly before the root morpheme that carries the main lexical meaning.

The prefix -мы- is specifically required when:

- Issuing a command (e.g., :у-мы-тх "you don't write / do not write", :у-мы-кIо "you don't go / do not go").
- Using conditional suffixes. For example, when adding -мэ ("if"), -ми ("even if"), and -и ("and"):
  - :сы-къы-пфэ-мы-щэмэ "if you can't bring me"
  - :у-къа-мы-гъа-кIомэ "if you aren't forced to come"
- Forming participles and adding particles.

The use of vowels and pronominal prefixes in conjunction with the negative -мы- changes depending on whether the verb is intransitive or transitive.

==== Intransitive ====
Intransitive verbs focus on the action generally, without a specific direct object.

Examples with conditionals:

- сэ сымытхэмэ — if I don't write
- ар мытхэмэ — if (s)he doesn't write
- сэ сымыкIомэ — if I don't go
- ар мыкIомэ — if (s)he doesn't go
- сэ семыджэмэ — if I don't read / study
- ар емыджэмэ — if (s)he doesn't read / study
- сэ ащ семыплъымэ — if I don't look at it
- ар ащ емыплъымэ — if (s)he doesn't look at it

Examples with participles:

- мытхэрэп — the one who does not write (present)
- мытхагъэр — the one who did not write (past)
- мытхэщтыр — the one who will not write (future)

==== Transitive ====
Transitive verbs focus on an action directed at a specific object.

Examples with conditionals:

- сэ ар сымытхымэ — if I don't write it
- ащ ар ымытхымэ — if (s)he doesn't write it
- сэ ар сымылъэгъумэ — if I don't see it
- ащ ар ымылъэгъумэ — if (s)he doesn't see it
- сэ ар сымылъэгъугъэмэ — if I didn't see it
- ащ ар ымылъэгъугъэмэ — if (s)he didn't see it

Examples with participles:

- сымытхыр — what I don't write (present)
- ымытхыр — what (s)he doesn't write (present)
- зымытхыр — the one who doesn't write it (present, relative)
- сымытхыгъэр — what I didn't write (past)
- ымытхыгъэр — what (s)he didn't write (past)
- зымытхыгъэр — the one who didn't write it (past, relative)
- сымытхыщтыр — what I will not write (future)
- ымытхыщтыр — what (s)he will not write (future)
- зымытхыщтыр — the one who will not write it (future, relative)

== Tense ==
Tense	Suffix	Example	Meaning
Present	~∅	макӀо [maːkʷʼa]	(s)he is going; (s)he goes
Simple past	~агъэ / ~гъ(э)	кӀуагъ [kʷʼaːʁ]	(s)he went
Discontinuous past	~гъагъ [~ʁaːʁ]	кӀогъагъ [kʷʼaʁaːʁ]	(s)he went (but is not there anymore)
Pluperfect	~гъагъ [~ʁaːʁ]	кӀогъагъ [kʷʼaʁaːʁ]	(s)he had gone
Remote past	~гъагъ [~ʁaːʁ]	кӀогъагъ [kʷʼaʁaːʁ]	(s)he went back then / a long time ago
Past of the distant past (remote pluperfect)	~гъагъ [~ʁaːʁ]	кӀогъагъ [kʷʼaʁaːʁ]	(s)he had gone a long time ago
Categorical future	~н [~n]	кӀон [kʷʼan]	(s)he will go
Factual future	~щт [~ɕt]	кӀощт [kʷʼaɕt]	(s)he will go; (s)he is about to go
Imperfect	~щтыгъ [~ɕtəʁ]	кӀощтыгъ [kʷʼaɕtəʁ]	(s)he was going; (s)he used to go
Conditional perfect	~щтыгъ [~ɕtəʁ]	кӀощтыгъ [kʷʼaɕtəʁ]	(s)he would have gone
Future perfect	~гъэщт [~ʁaɕt]	кӀуагъэщт [kʷʼaːʁaɕt]	(s)he will have gone
Recent past	~гъакӀ [~ʁaːt͡ʃʼ]	кӀогъакӀ [kʷʼaʁaːt͡ʃʼ]	(s)he just (recently) went

=== Present tense ===
The Adyghe present has no tense suffix of its own. Instead it is marked by the dynamic prefix, descending from Proto-Circassian *уэ- and surfacing as the vowel -э- immediately before the verb root. This prefix appears only in positive present dynamic forms; it is absent in the past and future, in negatives, and in mood-marked forms. An underlying dynamic suffix *-р also belongs to the present: it surfaces as -р before another suffix but is silent when word-final (much as the final "r" is dropped in non-rhotic English cah, watah).

The present covers both the simple present (habits, general facts) and the present continuous (action in progress); context decides, e.g. сэлажьэ "I work" or "I am working", сэшъо (in тутын сешъо) "I smoke" or "I am smoking".

==== Disappearance of the dynamic prefix ====
The dynamic prefix surfaces only when the verb is at once present, positive, and mood-less. If any one of these fails — a shift to past or future, a negative, or a mood such as the conditional — the prefix -э- simply vanishes, leaving the personal prefix (сы-) or its bare consonant (с-) directly on the root. The potential suffix -шъу and the repetitive suffix -жьы are not moods and leave the verb in the present, so the prefix is retained beside them.

Retention vs. dropping of the dynamic prefix ("to go")
Grammatical context	1st sg. ("I go")	3rd sg. ("(s)he goes")
Present positive (prefix active)	сэкӀо с-э-кӀо	мэкӀо мэ-кӀо
Present + potential (retained)	сэкӀошъу с-э-кӀо-шъу	мэкӀошъу мэ-кӀо-шъу
Present + repetitive (retained)	сэкӀожьы с-э-кӀо-жьы	мэкӀожьы мэ-кӀо-жьы
Past (drops)	скӀуагъ с-кӀу-агъ	кӀуагъ ∅-кӀу-агъ
Future (drops)	скӀощт с-кӀо-щт	кӀощт ∅-кӀо-щт
Negative (drops)	сыкӀорэп сы-кӀо-рэп	кӀорэп ∅-кӀо-рэп
Conditional (drops)	сыкӀомэ сы-кӀо-мэ	кӀомэ ∅-кӀо-мэ

==== Valency and the position of the prefix ====
The prefix always sits directly before the root, but its surface shape depends on valency. The tables below pair the positive present (top) with the negative (bottom); the negative drops the prefix and the suffix -р resurfaces before the ending -эп. A Proto-Circassian column is added, its negative using the old prefix *-мы- in the prefix slot.

Monovalent (intransitive) verbs take one argument; the prefix sits between the subject prefix and the root. In the third person there is no overt personal prefix, so the prefix would stand word-initially — and because it cannot open a word as a bare vowel, it mutates to мэ-. This мэ- is the dynamic prefix in disguise, not a pronoun, so it too drops in the past, future, negative and conditional (hence no *макӀорэп, *мэкӀуагъ, *макӀомэ).

Monovalent intransitive present ("to go"), positive / negative
Person	Form	Underlying	Proto-Circassian (pos / neg)
1st sg.	сэкӀо сыкӀорэп	с-э-кӀо сы-кӀо-р-эп	*сы-уэ-кӀуэ-р *сы-мы-кӀуэ-р
3rd sg.	макӀо кӀорэп	э-кӀо → мэ-кӀо кӀо-р-эп	*∅-уэ-кӀуэ-р *∅-мы-кӀуэ-р
3rd pl.	макӀох кӀохэрэп	э-кӀо-х → мэ-кӀо-х кӀо-хэ-р-эп	*∅-уэ-кӀуэ-хэ-р *∅-мы-кӀуэ-хэ-р

Bivalent intransitive verbs take an absolutive subject and an oblique object; here the prefix is no longer word-initial, so it never mutates to мэ-. Inverse combinations (a lower-ranked argument acting on a higher one) are marked by the directional къы-, which sits outside the dynamic slot.

Bivalent intransitive present ("to look at"), positive / negative
Meaning	Form	Underlying	Proto-Circassian (pos / neg)
1 → 3 "I look at him"	сеплъы сеплъырэп	сы-й-э-плъы сы-й-плъы-р-эп	*сы-йэ-уэ-плъы-р *сы-йэ-мы-плъы-р
1 → 2 "I look at you"	сыоплъы сыоплъырэп	с-у-э-плъы с-у-плъы-р-эп	*сы-уы-уэ-плъы-р *сы-уы-мы-плъы-р
3 → 1 "(s)he looks at me"	къысэплъы къысэплъырэп	∅-къы-сы-э-плъы ∅-къы-сы-плъы-р-эп	*∅-къы-сы-уэ-плъы-р *∅-къы-сы-мы-плъы-р

Bivalent transitive verbs have an ergative subject and absolutive object; the prefix follows the ergative marker. In the third person it fuses with the ergative pronoun, Adyghe ы- surfacing as е- (sg.) and а- (pl.); the negative exposes the bare ergative (ы-).

Bivalent transitive present ("to see"), positive / negative
Meaning	Form	Underlying	Proto-Circassian (pos / neg)
1 → 3 "I see him"	сэлъэгъу слъэгъурэп	∅-с-э-лъэгъу ∅-с-лъэгъу-р-эп	*∅-сы-уэ-лъагъу-р *∅-сы-мы-лъагъу-р
3 → 3 "(s)he sees him"	елъэгъу ылъэгъурэп	∅-ы→е-лъэгъу ∅-ы-лъэгъу-р-эп	*∅-йы-уэ-лъагъу-р *∅-йы-мы-лъагъу-р
3pl → 3 "they see him"	алъэгъу алъэгъурэп	∅-а-лъэгъу ∅-а-лъэгъу-р-эп	*∅-я-уэ-лъагъу-р *∅-я-мы-лъагъу-р

Trivalent verbs (ergative subject, absolutive object, oblique indirect object) keep the prefix in the same slot before the root; inverse forms again take къ(ы)- at the front.

Trivalent present ("to give it"), positive / negative
Meaning	Form	Underlying	Proto-Circassian (pos / neg)
1 → 3 "I give it to him"	есэты естырэп	∅-йэ-с-э-ты ∅-йэ-с-ты-р-эп	*∅-йэ-сы-уэ-ты-р *∅-йэ-сы-мы-ты-р
1 → 2 "I give it to you"	къыосэты къыостырэп	къы-о-с-э-ты къы-о-с-ты-р-эп	*уы-сы-уэ-ты-р *уы-сы-мы-ты-р

=== Past tenses ===
==== Simple past ====
The simple past, suffix ~гъ (also ~агъ / ~ыгъ), is the neutral past, used for completed events without stressing present relevance: кӀуагъ "(s)he went". Verbs in -э usually shift it to -а- before -гъ; the dynamic prefix is always dropped.

Present	Simple past	Meaning
ар макӀо	ар кӀуагъ	"He goes" → "He went"
ащ ар еукӀы	ащ ар ыукӀыгъ	"He kills him" → "He killed him"

Conjugation of еджэн "to read": седжагъ "I read (past)", negative седжагъэп; 3rd sg. еджагъ / еджагъэп.

==== Pluperfect, discontinuous and remote past ====
A second past in ~гъагъ covers three related readings, disambiguated by context: a true pluperfect ("had gone", anchored before another past event), a discontinuous past (the result no longer holds: Америкэм сыщыӀэгъагъ "I was in America [but no longer]"), and a remote past ("back then, a long time ago" — relative, so it can even mean "way earlier today"). Adyghe uses the single suffix ~гъагъ for all of these distant timelines, where Kabardian additionally has dedicated ~гъащ / ~гъат forms.

Present	Pluperfect	Meaning
ар макӀо	ар кӀогъагъ	"He goes" → "He had gone (but is back)"
ащ ар еукӀы	ащ ар ыукӀыгъагъ	"He kills him" → "He had killed him"

A recent past in ~гъакӀ (кӀогъакӀ "just went") marks an action as having happened very recently.

=== Future tenses ===
Adyghe has a factual future in ~щт — a concrete plan or near-certain fact (кӀощт "(s)he will go / is about to go") — and a categorical future in ~н with a slightly weaker certainty (кӀон "(s)he will go").

Factual future ~щт (positive / negative)
Person	еджэн (to read)	лъэгъун (to see)
1st sg.	седжэщт седжэщтэп	слъэгъущт слъэгъущтэп
3rd sg.	еджэщт еджэщтэп	ылъэгъущт ылъэгъущтэп

A future perfect in ~гъэщт (often ~гъахэщт with "already") marks an action finished before a future point: седжагъэщт "I will have read"; сыкъэщэгъахэщт "I will already be married".

=== Imperfect ===
The imperfect adds ~щтыгъ and has two readings: habitual ("used to") and continuous ("was ...ing"). In some dialects the analytic -эу щытыгъ alternates with the suffix (e.g. Тутын сешъощтыгъ = Тутын сешъоу щытыгъ).

Adyghe	Meaning
Тутын сешъощтыгъ ау джы спортым сыпыхьагъ.	"I used to smoke but now I am into sports." (habitual)
Тучаным сыкӀощтыгъ къещхэу къызежьэм.	"I was going to the shop when it started raining." (continuous)

The same suffix ~щтыгъ also serves as the conditional perfect ("would have done"), the meaning being recovered from an accompanying conditional clause in -мэ: Университетым сыщеджэгъагъэмэ, джы Ӏоф нахь дэгъу сӀэщтыгъ "If I had studied at university, I would have a better job now."

== Infinitives ==
Adyghe infinitives are created by suffixing -н (/-n/) to the verb stem.

Verb Stem	Infinitive	IPA	Meaning
кӀо~	кӀон	[kʷʼan]	"to go"
чъые~	чъыен	[t͡ʂəjan]	"to sleep"
гущыӀэ~	гущыӀэн	[ɡʷəɕəːʔan]	"to talk"

=== Person marking in infinitives ===
Unlike in many European languages, Adyghe infinitives can retain person markers. This allows the infinitive to indicate who is performing the action.

- Present tense: ошхэ /waʃxa/ — "you are eating"
- Infinitive: ушхэн /wəʃxan/ — "(for) you to eat"

=== Stative infinitives (nouns as verbs) ===
Due to the interchangeability of nouns and verbs in Adyghe, infinitives can be constructed from nouns or adjectives. These result in verbs describing the state of "being" that noun or adjective.

Root Word	Meaning	Infinitive	Meaning
фабэ	hot	фэбэн	"to be hot"
чэщы	night	чэщын	"to be night"
дахэ	pretty	дэхэн	"to be pretty"

==== Usage examples ====
The infinitive is often used with modal words like фай ("must" or "want").

Sentence	Gloss	Translation
Пшъашъэр дэхэн фай.	Girl-ABS to-be-pretty must	"The girl must be pretty."
Тиунэ укъихьан пае, укъэбзэн фай.	Our-house you-enter-INF in-order-to, you-clean-be-INF must	"To come inside our house, you must be clean."

=== Future / Adverbial infinitive ===
For the future tense or to express purpose (supine), the suffix -нэу (/-naw/) is used. This is essentially the infinitive marker -н combined with the adverbial case marker -эу.

Sentence	Gloss	Translation
Сэ къыосӀонэу сыфай.	I DIR-2SG-1SG-say-INF-FUT 1SG-want	"I want to tell you."
ЦӀыфым шъушхэнэу къышъуиӀуагъ.	Person-ERG 2PL-eat-INF-FUT DIR-2PL-3SG-said	"The person told you (pl.) to eat."

== Morphology ==
Morphology is a central component of Circassian grammar. A single Circassian word, particularly a verb, can function as a complete sentence due to its polypersonal nature. Through a rich system of prefixes and suffixes, a verb can express the person, number, and role of the subject, direct object, and indirect object, as well as tense, mood, negation, location, and direction.

=== Prefixes ===
Adyghe utilizes a variety of prefixes to alter the meaning or valency of a verb. Most verbal prefixes either express direction (on, under, etc.) or increase the valency (adding participants like beneficiaries or co-actors).

==== Negative form ====
Negation in Adyghe is expressed through two primary morphemes, depending on the context and tense.

1. Infix/Prefix ~мы~ Used primarily in the imperative mood (commands) and with participles.

Base verb	Meaning	Negative form	Meaning
кӀо	go!	умыкӀу	don't go!
шхы	eat!	умышх	don't eat!
шъучъый	sleep! (pl)	шъумычъый	don't sleep! (pl)

2. Suffix ~эп Used primarily in indicative tenses (past, present, future). It usually attaches to the very end of the verb complex.

Base verb	Meaning	Negative form	Meaning
кӀуагъэ	(s)he went	кӀуагъэп	(s)he didn't go
машхэ	(s)he is eating	шхэрэп	(s)he is not eating
еджэщт	(s)he will read	еджэщтэп	(s)he will not read

==== Causative ====
The prefix гъэ~ (/ʁa/) indicates causation (making or letting someone do something). It increases the valency of the verb by adding a causer.

Base word	Meaning	Causative form	Meaning
фабэ	hot	егъэфабэ	(s)he heats it
чъыӀэ	cold	егъэучъыӀы	(s)he chills it
макӀо	(s)he goes	егъакӀо	(s)he sends him/her
еджэ	(s)he reads	регъаджэ	(s)he teaches him/her

Examples:

- КӀалэм ышы тучаным егъакӀо. — "The boy sends his brother to the shop."
- Пшъашъэм итхылъ сэ сыригъэджагъ. — "The girl allowed me to read her book."

==== Comitative ====
The prefix дэ~ (/da/) indicates an action performed together with someone ("with").

Base verb	Meaning	Comitative form	Meaning
макӀо	(s)he goes	дакӀо	(s)he goes with him/her
еплъы	(s)he looks at	деплъы	(s)he looks at it with him/her
чӀэс	(s)he sits in	дэчӀэс	(s)he sits in it with him/her

Examples:

- КӀалэр пшъашъэм дэгущыӀэ. — "The boy is talking with the girl."
- КӀэлэцӀыкӀухэр зэдэджэгух. — "The kids are playing together."
- Сэрэ сышырэ тучанэм тызэдакӀо. — "Me and my brother are going to the shop together."

==== Benefactive ====
The prefix фэ~ (/fa/) indicates an action performed for someone's benefit ("for").

Base verb	Meaning	Benefactive form	Meaning
макӀо	(s)he goes	факӀо	(s)he goes for him/her
еплъы	(s)he looks at	феплъы	(s)he looks at it for him/her
чӀэс	(s)he sits in	фэчӀэс	(s)he sits in it for him/her

Examples:

- КӀалэр пшъашъэм факӀо тучаным. — "The boy is going to the shop for the girl."
- КӀалэм псы лӀым фехьы. — "The boy is bringing water for the man."
- Къэсфэщэф зыгорэ сешъонэу. — "Buy something for me to drink."

==== Malefactive ====
The prefix шӀу~ (/ʃʷʼa/) indicates an action performed against someone's interest or will. It strongly implies taking something away from someone.

Base verb	Meaning	Malefactive form	Meaning
ехьы	(s)he carries it	шӀуехьы	(s)he takes it from him
етыгъу	(s)he steals it	шӀуетыгъу	(s)he steals it from him
ештэ	(s)he takes it	шӀуештэ	(s)he takes it away from him
ешхы	(s)he eats	шӀуешхы	(s)he eats his food (loss)

Examples:

- СичӀыгу къэсшӀуахьыгъ. — "They took my land away from me."
- Сянэ симашинэ къэсшӀодищыгъ. — "My mother took my car out (against my interest/will)."
- КӀалэм шӀуешхы пшъашъэм ишхын. — "The boy is eating the girl's food (depriving her of it)."

=== Suffixes ===
Adyghe uses suffixes to express aspect, capability, manner, and other nuances.

==== Frequentative / Reversive ====
The verbal suffix ~жь (/ʑ/) indicates the repetition of an action ("again") or the return to a previous state/location ("back"). It can also denote the completion of an action.

Base verb	Meaning	Frequentative form	Meaning
ехьы	(s)he carries it	ехьыжьы	(s)he takes it back/again
ештэ	(s)he takes it	ештэжьы	(s)he takes it back
ешхы	(s)he eats	ешхыжьы	(s)he eats again

Examples:

- ЛӀым иӀофы ешӀыжьы. — "The man is doing his job again."
- Хым сыкӀожьынэу сыфай. — "I want to return to the sea."
- Экзамыным сыфеджэжьыгъ. — "I finished studying for the exam."

==== Duration / Converb ====
The verbal suffix ~эу (/aw/) creates a converb, designating an action that takes place simultaneously with another action ("while").

Base verb	Meaning	Duration form	Meaning
макӀо	(s)he goes	кӀоу	while going
ештэ	(s)he takes it	ештэу	while taking it
ешхы	(s)he eats	ешхэу	while eating

Examples:

- СыкӀоу слъэгъугъ кӀалэр. — "While I was going, I saw the boy."
- Сянэ тиунэ ытхьэкӀэу унэм сыкъихьажьыгъ. — "I came home while my mother was washing the house."
- Шхын щымыӀэу тыкъэнагъ. — "We are left with no food."

==== Capability ====
The verbal suffix ~шъу (/ʃʷə/) designates the ability or potential to perform the indicated action ("can", "able to").

Base verb	Meaning	Capability form	Meaning
ехьы	(s)he carries it	ехьышъу	(s)he can carry it
ештэ	(s)he takes it	ештэшъу	(s)he can take it
ешхы	(s)he eats	ешхышъу	(s)he can eat

Examples:

- ЛӀыжъыр мэчъэшъу. — "The old man is capable of running."
- Экзамыным сыфеджэшъу. — "I can study for the exam."
- Фылымым сеплъышъугъэп. — "I could not watch the movie."

==== Manner ====
The verbal suffix ~акӀэ (/aːt͡ʃʼa/) expresses the manner in which the action is performed. It effectively turns the verb into a noun meaning "way of [verb]ing".

Base verb	Meaning	Manner noun	Meaning
макӀо	(s)he goes	кӀуакӀэ	gait / way of walking
е1о	(s)he says it	1уаакӀэ	way of saying
еджэ	(s)he reads/studies	еджакӀэ	way of studying

Examples:

- Пшъашъэм икӀуакӀэ дахэ. — "The girl's way of walking is beautiful."
- КӀалэм иеджакӀэ дэгъоп. — "The boy's way of studying is not good."
- Унэм ишӀыкӀэ тэрэзэп. — "The house is not structured right"

Alternatively, manner can be expressed using the prefix зэрэ~ (/zara/) combined with a case marker on the verb, though this functions syntactically as a relative clause ("how (s)he does it").

- Пшъашъэр зэрэкӀорэр дахэ. — "The way the girl goes is beautiful."

== Moods ==
Adyghe verbs change their form to express the attitude of the speaker toward the action (mood). This includes commands, conditions, wishes, and questions.

=== Imperative mood ===
The imperative mood is used to give commands or make requests.

- **Singular (2nd Person):** Uses the bare verb root with no additional affixes.
- **Plural (2nd Person):** Uses the prefix шъу- (/ʃʷə-/) attached to the root.

Verb meaning	Singular (You)	IPA	Plural (You all)	IPA
To go	кӀо	[kʷʼa]	шъукӀу	[ʃʷəkʷʼ]
To take	штэ	[ʃta]	шъушт	[ʃʷəʃt]
To write	тхы	[txə]	шъутх	[ʃʷətx]
To eat	шхэ	[ʃxa]	шъушх	[ʃʷəʃx]
To look	еплъ	[japɬ]	шъуеплъ	[ʃʷajpɬ]
To wait	еж	[jaʒ]	шъуеж	[ʃʷajʒ]

=== Conditional mood ===
The conditional mood expresses a condition ("if"). It is formed by the suffix ~мэ (/~ma/).

Adyghe	Analysis	Translation
СыкӀомэ	1SG-go-COND	"If I go"
Къещхымэ	DIR-rain-COND	"If it rains"
Ар дэгъумэ	That good-COND	"If that is good"
Уфаемэ	2SG-want-COND	"If you want"

=== Concessive mood ===
The concessive mood expresses a contrast or concession ("even if", "although"). It is formed by the suffix ~ми (/~mi/).

Adyghe	Analysis	Translation
СыкӀоми	1SG-go-CONC	"Even if I go"
Къымыщхыгъэми	DIR-NEG-rain-PST-CONC	"Even if it didn't rain"
Лъэшыми	Strong-CONC	"Although he is strong"
УимыӀэми	2SG-POSS-NEG-have-CONC	"Even if you don't have it"

=== Optative mood ===
The optative mood expresses a wish, desire, or hypothetical outcome ("would that", "if only"). It is formed by the complex suffix ~гъот (/~ʁwat/), often attached to the past tense form of the verb.

Adyghe	Analysis	Translation
УкӀуагъот	2SG-go-PST-OPT	"If only you went / Would that you went"
Къэсыгъагъот	DIR-arrive-PST-OPT	"I wish he had arrived"
Сычъыягъот	1SG-sleep-PST-OPT	"I wish I could sleep"

=== Interrogative mood ===
The interrogative mood is used to ask Yes/No questions. It is marked by the suffix ~а (/~aː/).

Adyghe	Analysis	Translation
Мада?	sew-Q	"Is he sewing?"
КӀуагъа?	went-Q	"Did he go?"
Уфая?	2SG-want-Q	"Do you want?"
Даха?	Beautiful-Q	"Is she beautiful?"

=== Negative interrogative mood ===
This mood asks a question while expecting a positive answer ("isn't it?", "right?"). It is marked by the suffix ~ба (/~baː/).

Adyghe	Analysis	Translation
МакӀоба?	go-NEG.Q	"He is going, isn't he?"
Уфаеба?	2SG-want-NEG.Q	"You want it, right?"
КӀуагъэба?	went-NEG.Q	"He went, didn't he?"
ШӀуба?	Good-NEG.Q	"It is good, isn't it?"

== Positional conjugation ==
In Adyghe, the positional prefixes are expressing being in different positions and places and can also express the direction of the verb. Here is the positional conjugation of some dynamic verbs, showing how the prefix changes the indicated direction of the verb:

Position	Prefix	Example	
Position	Prefix	Looking	Throwing
Body position/Pose	щы~ [ɕə]	щеплъэ [ɕajpɬa] "(s)he is looking at that place"	щедзы [ɕajd͡za] "(s)he is throwing at that place"
On	те~ [taj]	теплъэ [ɕajpɬa] "(s)he is looking on"	тедзэ [ɕajd͡za] "(s)he is throwing at"
Under	чӀэ~ [ʈ͡ʂʼa]	чӀаплъэ [ʈ͡ʂʼaːpɬa] "(s)he is looking under"	чӀедзэ [ʈ͡ʂʼajd͡za] "(s)he is throwing under"
Through/Within some mass	хэ~ [xa]	хаплъэ [xaːpɬa] "(s)he is looking through"	хедзэ [xajd͡za] "(s)he is throwing through"
Within some area	дэ~ [da]	даплъэ [daːpɬa] "(s)he is looking at some area"	дедзэ [dajd͡za] "(s)he is throwing at some area"
Inside an object	дэ~ [da]	даплъэ [daːpɬa] "(s)he is looking inside an object"	дедзэ [dajd͡za] "(s)he is throwing inside an object"
Around	Ӏу~ [ʔʷə]	Ӏуаплъэ [ʔʷaːpɬa] "(s)he is looking around"	Ӏуедзэ [ʔʷajd͡za] "(s)he is throwing around"
Inside	и~ [jə~]	еплъэ [japɬa] "(s)he is looking inside"	редзэ [rajd͡za] "(s)he is throwing inside"
Hanged/Attached	пы [pə]	пэплъэ [papɬa] "(s)he is searching by looking"	педзэ [pajd͡za] "(s)he is hanging by throwing"
Behind	къо [qʷa]	къуаплъэ [qʷaːpɬa] "(s)he is looking behind"	къуедзэ [qʷajd͡za] "(s)he is throwing behind"
Aside	го [ɡʷa]	гуаплъэ [ɡʷaːpɬa] "(s)he is looking aside"	гуедзэ [ɡʷajd͡za] "(s)he is throwing aside"
In front of	пэӀу [paʔʷə]	пэӀуаплъэ [paʔʷaːpɬa] "(s)he is looking in front of"	пэӀуедзэ [paʔʷajd͡za] "(s)he is throwing in front of"
Backwards	зэкӀ [zat͡ʃʼ]	зэкӀаплъэ [zat͡ʃʼaːpɬa] "(s)he is looking backwards"	зэкӀедзэ [zat͡ʃʼajd͡za] "(s)he is throwing backwards"
Inside within	кӀоцӀы [kʷʼat͡sʼə]	кӀоцӀаплъэ [kʷʼat͡sʼaːpɬa] "(s)he is looking within inside"	кӀоцӀедзэ [kʷʼat͡sʼajd͡za] "(s)he is throwing within inside"
Near	кӀэлъыры [ּ֫t͡ʃʼaɬərə]	кӀэлъырыплъэ [t͡ʃʼaɬərəpɬa] "(s)he is looking near"	кӀэлъыредзы [t͡ʃʼaɬərajd͡zə] "(s)he is throwing near"
Toward	лъы [ɬə]	лъэплъэ [ɬapɬa] "(s)he is looking toward"	лъедзы [ɬajd͡zə] "(s)he is throwing toward"
Past	блэ [bɮa]	блэплъы [bɮapɬə] "(s)he is looking past"	бледзэ [bɮajd͡za] "(s)he is throwing past"
Toward the head	шъхьары [ʂħaːrə]	шъхьарыплъы [ʂħarapɬə] "(s)he is looking at the head"	шъхьаредзы [ʂħarajd͡zə] "(s)he is throwing at the head"
Over	шъхьадэ [ʂħaːda]	шъхьэдэплъы [ʂħadapɬə] "(s)he is looking pass over"	шъхьэдедзы [ʂħadajd͡zə] "(s)he is throwing pass over"
Over and beyond	шъхьапыры [ʂħaːpərə]	шъхьапырыплъы [ʂħaːpərəpɬə] "(s)he is looking beyond"	шъхьапыредзы [ʂħaːpərajd͡zə] "(s)he is throwing beyond"
Directly at	жэхэ [ʒaxa]	жэхаплъэ [ʒaxaːpɬa] "(s)he is glaring at one's face"	жэхедзэ [ʒaxajd͡za] "(s)he is throwing at one's face"
Directed toward a mouth	жэдэ~ [ʒada~]	жэдаплъэ [ʒadaːpɬa] "(s)he is looking at a mouth"	жэдедзэ [ʒadajd͡za] "(s)he is throwing at a mouth"

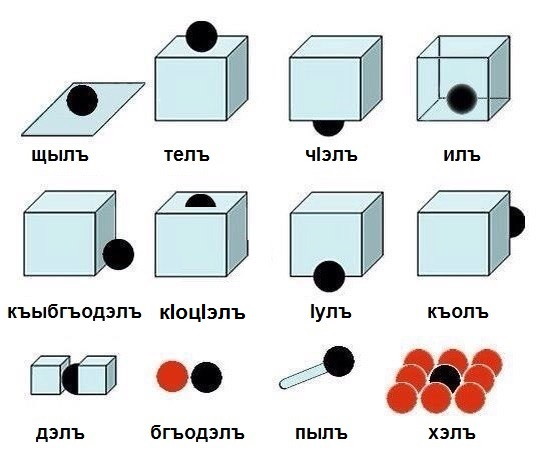
The positional conjugations in Adyghe.

кӀалэм шхынхэр Ӏанэм телъхьэх
кӀалэ-м шхын-хэ-р Ӏанэ-м те-лъхьэ-х
t͡ʃʼaːɮam ʃxənxar ʔaːnam tajɬħax
boy-ERG food-PL-ABS table-ERG on-put.PRS.3SG
"The boy is putting the foods on the table."

мы гущыӀэм къэлэмкӀэ гуатх
мы гущыӀ-эм къэлэм-кӀэ гуа-тх
mə ɡʷəɕəʔam qalamt͡ʃʼa ɡʷaːtx
DEF word-ERG pencil-INS write besides
"Write besides this word with a pencil"

=== Transitivity and positional ===
Adding a positional prefix to a verb often alters its valency by introducing a new spatial or locative argument. This new argument is always placed in the oblique case (marked by -м). The behavior of the verb and its arguments changes depending on its original transitivity.

==== Monovalent intransitive verbs ====
When a positional prefix is attached to a monovalent intransitive verb, it adds a new valency. Because they don't have an oblique case argument by default, the new argument serves as the locative target, effectively turning it into a bivalent intransitive verb. Notice how the default dynamic 3rd-person prefix (мэ-/ма-) drops when the positional prefix is introduced.

Sentence	Word breakdown	Gloss	Function	Translation
Ар мэплъэ.	ар мэ-плъэ	He 3SG.ABS-look	S VERB	"He is looking."
Ар ащ теплъэ.	ар ащ ø-те-плъэ	He that 3SG.ABS-on-look	S IO VERB	"He is looking on/at that."
КӀалэр мэгущыӀэ.	кӀалэ-р мэ-гущыӀэ	boy-ABS 3SG.ABS-speak	S VERB	"The boy is speaking."
КӀалэр пшъашъэм тегущыӀэ.	кӀалэ-р пшъашъэ-м ø-те-гущыӀэ	boy-ABS girl-OBL 3SG.ABS-on-speak	S IO VERB	"The boy is speaking about the girl."
КӀалэр матхэ.	кӀалэ-р ма-тхэ	boy-ABS 3SG.ABS-write	S VERB	"The boy is writing."
КӀалэр Ӏанэм тетхэ.	кӀалэ-р Ӏанэ-м ø-те-тхэ	boy-ABS table-OBL 3SG.ABS-on-write	S IO VERB	"The boy is writing on the table."
Сэ о сыптегущыӀэ.	сэ о сы-п-те-гущыӀэ	I you 1SG.ABS-2SG.OBL-on-speak	S IO VERB	"I talk about you."
О сэ укъыстегущыӀэ.	о сэ у-къы-с-те-гущыӀэ	You me 2SG.ABS-DIR-1SG.OBL-on-speak	S IO VERB	"You talk about me."
О оплъэ.	о о-плъэ	You 2SG.ABS-look	S VERB	"You look."
О сэ укъысэплъэ.	о сэ у-къы-с-э-плъэ	You me 2SG.ABS-DIR-1SG.OBL-DAT-look	S IO VERB	"You look at me."
О сэ укъыстеплъэ.	о сэ у-къы-с-те-плъэ	You me 2SG.ABS-DIR-1SG.OBL-on-look	S IO VERB	"You look on/at me."
Сэ о скъыптеплъэ.	сэ о с-къы-п-те-плъэ	I you 1SG.ABS-DIR-2SG.OBL-on-look	S IO VERB	"I look on/at you."

==== Bivalent intransitive verbs ====
Bivalent intransitive verbs cannot simply take a new positional preposition because they already have an argument in the oblique case behaving as a dative/target. Instead, the positional prefix replaces the standard directional prefix, shifting the existing oblique noun/pronoun from a general dative target to a specific locative one.

Sentence	Word breakdown	Gloss	Function	Translation
КӀалэр пшынэм ео.	кӀалэ-р пшынэ-м ø-е-о	boy-ABS accordion-OBL 3SG.ABS-DAT-hit	S IO VERB	"The boy hits the accordion."
КӀалэр пшынэм тео.	кӀалэ-р пшынэ-м ø-те-о	boy-ABS accordion-OBL 3SG.ABS-on-hit	S IO VERB	"The boy hits on the accordion."
Сэ сэо.	сэ с-э-о	I 1SG.ABS-DAT-hit	S VERB	"I hit."
Сэ о сыкъыоо.	сэ о сы-къы-о-о	I you 1SG.ABS-DIR-2SG.OBL-hit	S IO VERB	"I hit you."
Сэ о сыптео.	сэ о сы-п-те-о	I you 1SG.ABS-2SG.OBL-on-hit	S IO VERB	"I hit on you."

==== Bivalent transitive verbs ====
Standard bivalent transitive verbs have an ergative subject and an absolutive direct object, but no oblique role. The addition of a positional prefix introduces a new locative argument in the oblique case, turning the verb into a trivalent transitive verb. Note how the positional prefix stacks with the ergative marker.

Sentence	Word breakdown	Gloss	Function	Translation
КӀалэм мыжъор едзы.	кӀалэ-м мыжъо-р ø-е-дзы	boy-ERG stone-ABS 3SG.ABS-3SG.ERG-throw	A O VERB	"The boy throws the stone."
КӀалэм мыжъор хым хедзэ.	кӀалэ-м мыжъо-р хы-м ø-х-е-дзэ	boy-ERG stone-ABS sea-OBL 3SG.ABS-in-3SG.ERG-throw	A O IO VERB	"The boy throws the stone into the sea."
КӀалэм гущыӀэр етхы.	кӀалэ-м гущыӀэ-р ø-е-тхы	boy-ERG word-ABS 3SG.ABS-3SG.ERG-write	A O VERB	"The boy writes the word."
КӀалэм гущыӀэр Ӏанэм тетхы.	кӀалэ-м гущыӀэ-р Ӏанэ-м ø-те-т-хы	boy-ERG word-ABS table-OBL 3SG.ABS-on-3SG.ERG-write	A O IO VERB	"The boy writes the word on the table."
КӀалэм пшъашъэр елъэгъу.	кӀалэ-м пшъашъэ-р ø-е-лъэгъу	boy-ERG girl-ABS 3SG.ABS-3SG.ERG-see	A O VERB	"The boy sees the girl."
КӀалэм пшъашъэр чъыгым чӀелъагъо.	кӀалэ-м пшъашъэ-р чъыгы-м ø-чӀ-е-лъагъо	boy-ERG girl-ABS tree-OBL 3SG.ABS-under-3SG.ERG-see	A O IO VERB	"The boy sees the girl under the tree."
Сэ о осэлъэгъу.	сэ о о-с-э-лъэгъу	I you 2SG.ABS-1SG.ERG-PRS-see	A O VERB	"I see you."
Сэ о унашъхьэм утесэлъэгъу.	сэ о у-нашъхьэ-м у-те-с-э-лъэгъу	I you 2SG-head-OBL 2SG.ABS-on-1SG.ERG-PRS-see	A O IO VERB	"I see you on your head."
О сэ унашъхьэм стеолъэгъу.	о сэ у-нашъхьэ-м с-те-о-лъэгъу	You me 2SG-head-OBL 1SG.ABS-on-2SG.ERG-see	A O IO VERB	"You see me on your head."

==== Trivalent transitive verbs ====
Trivalent transitive verbs (also called ditransitive verbs) cannot take a positional prefix. This is because these verbs inherently require three arguments (Agent, Theme, and Recipient/Goal), meaning their oblique case slot is already occupied. Adding a locative positional prefix would conflict with the existing indirect object argument structure.

=== Positional verbs ===
In Adyghe, certain verb roots denote a general sense of motion—such as entering, exiting, removing, or falling—but they cannot exist on their own. They inherently require a positional prefix to specify the spatial nature of the action.

Below is a matrix showing how these bound motion roots combine with common positional prefixes: те- (on), чӀэ- (under), и- (inside), and хэ- (within a mass/liquid).

Note: For the transitive roots (хын and фын), the 3rd-person singular ergative marker -е- stacks and merges with the positional prefix (e.g., чӀэ + е + хы + н = чӀехын).

Root	Action	те- (On)	чӀэ- (Under)	и- (Inside)	хэ- (Within Mass)
-хьан	to enter / step into	техьан "to step on"	чӀэхьан "to step under"	ихьан "to enter (inside)"	хэхьан "to enter (water/crowd)"
-кӀын	to exit / go off	текӀын "to get off"	чӀэкӀын "to exit from under"	икӀын "to exit (inside)"	хэкӀын "to exit (water/crowd)"
-хын (transitive)	to take off / remove	техын "to take off (from top)"	чӀехын "to take out from under"	ихын "to take out from inside"	хехын "to take out of (a mass)"
-фын (transitive)	to drive off / chase	тефын "to drive off (the top)"	чӀефын "to drive from under"	ифын "to drive out of (inside)"	хефын "to drive out of (a mass)"
-зын	to drop / fall off	тезын "to drop off (the top)"	чӀэзын "to drop from under"	изын "to drop out of (inside)"	хэзын "to drop out of (a mass)"
-лъэдэн	to run into	телъэдэн "to run onto"	чӀэлъэдэн "to run under"	илъэдэн "to run into (inside)"	хэлъэдэн "to run into (a mass)"
-шъутын	to exit running	тешъутын "to run off (the top)"	чӀэшъутын "to run out from under"	ишъутын "to run out of (inside)"	хэшъутын "to run out of (a mass)"
-фэн	to fall	тефэн "to fall on"	чӀэфэн "to fall under"	ифэн "to fall inside"	хэфэн "to fall into (a mass)"

=== Positional conjugation of static verbs ===
Here is the positional conjugation of some steady-state verbs, showing how the root changes the indicated position:

	prefix	stands	sits	lies
Body position/Pose	щы~ [ɕə]	щыт [ɕət]	щыс [ɕəs]	щылъ [ɕəɬ]
On	те~ [taj]	тет [tat]	тес [tas]	телъ [taɬ]
Under	чӀэ~ [ʈ͡ʂʼa]	чӀэт [ʈ͡ʂʼat]	чӀэс [ʈ͡ʂʼas]	чӀэлъ [ʈ͡ʂʼaɬ]
Among	хэ~ [xa]	хэт [xat]	хэс [xas]	хэлъ [xaɬ]
Within some mass	хэ~ [xa]	хэт [xat]	хэс [xas]	хэлъ [xaɬ]
Within some area	дэ~ [da]	дэт [dat]	дэс [das]	дэлъ [daɬ]
Inside an object	дэ~ [da]	дэт [dat]	дэс [das]	дэлъ [daɬ]
Around	Ӏу~ [ʔʷə]	Ӏут [ʔʷət]	Ӏyc [ʔʷəs]	Ӏулъ [ʔʷəɬ]
Inside	и~ [jə]	ит [jət]	иc [jəs]	илъ [jəɬ]
Hanged	пы~ [pə]	пыт [pət]	пыc [pəs]	пылъ [pəɬ]
Attached	пы~ [pə]	пыт [pət]	пыc [pəs]	пылъ [pəɬ]
Behind	къо~ [qʷa]	къот [qʷat]	къоc [qʷas]	къолъ [qʷaɬ]
Aside	го~ [ɡʷa]	гот [ɡʷat]	гоc [ɡʷas]	голъ [ɡʷaɬ]
Inside within	кӀоцӀы~ [kʷʼat͡sʼə]	кӀоцӀыт [kʷʼat͡sʼət]	кӀоцӀыc [kʷʼat͡sʼəs]	кӀоцӀылъ [kʷʼat͡sʼəɬ]

шхыныр Ӏанэм телъ
шхын-ыр Ӏанэ-м те-лъ
ʃxənər ʔaːnam tajɬ
food-ABS table-ERG on-lay.PRS
"The food is on the table"

кӀалэхэр тучаным Ӏутых
кӀалэ-хэ-р тучан-ым Ӏут-ых
t͡ʃʼaːɮaxar tut͡ʃaːnəm ʔʷətəx
boy-PL-ABS shop-ERG around-stand.PRS
"The boys are standing near the shop."

== Andative and venitive ==
Adyghe encodes the spatial orientation of an action directly on the verb. The venitive (also called cislocative) prefix къ(ы)~ (/qə-/) signals that the action is directed toward the deictic centre — the "here" of the speech situation — whereas its absence gives the andative reading: an action directed away (or spatially neutral). Compare:

- макӀо "(s)he goes (away)" → къакӀо "(s)he comes (here)"
- ехьы "(s)he takes (away)" → къехьы "(s)he brings (here)"

=== The 1 > 2 > 3 hierarchy ===
Which participant counts as the "here" is not arbitrary: it is fixed by a deictic (empathy) hierarchy,

1st person (speaker) > 2nd person (addressee) > 3rd person (anyone else),

and the centre is always the highest-ranked participant in the clause. The rule is then simple:

- If the action points up the hierarchy — toward the higher-ranked argument (the centre) — the verb takes the venitive къ(ы)~.
- If it points down — toward a lower-ranked argument — the bare andative form is used.

Three consequences follow, illustrated below:

1. An action whose goal is the 1st person is maximally central and almost always carries къ~.
2. When one is speaking to someone, the centre may project onto the 2nd person.
3. When a speech-act participant (1 or 2) and a 3rd person interact, къ~ marks the "upward" direction (3 → 1/2) and therefore inverts the expected subject–object reading.

=== Action toward the centre (1st / 2nd person) ===
Because an action aimed at the speaker travels to the very top of the hierarchy, the venitive is effectively obligatory there. This holds across every verb class:

Verb type	Andative (away / neutral)	Venitive (toward "me / here")
Throwing	дзы "throw it"	къэдз "throw it to me"
Transfer (give)	ты "give it"	къэт "give it to me"
Speech (say)	Ӏо "say it"	къаӀу "say it to me"
Perception (look)	плъэ "look"	къаплъ "look at me"
Carrying	хьы "carry it away"	къэхь "bring it to me"

None of these venitive forms contains an explicit "to me" object; grounding the action in the centre's "here" is enough to make the speaker the understood goal — just as English come! or bring it! defaults to "to me."

When the speaker is addressing someone, the same centre can project onto the 2nd person, so an action aimed at the addressee likewise takes къ~:

- скъыоплъы "I look at you"
- къыосэты "I give it to you"
- къыосэӀо "I say it to you"

=== 3rd person: inverse marking ===
The hierarchy becomes most visible when a 1st/2nd person interacts with a 3rd person. Here къ~ does more than add direction — it swaps the perspective, because the action is now read as moving up the hierarchy (3 → 1/2) instead of down:

- Сыфэд "I am like him" → Къысфэд "he is like me"
- СыдакӀо "I go with him" → КъыздакӀо "he comes with me"

Тэ кӀалэм тыдакӀо, шъо пшъашъэр къышъудакӀо
Тэ кӀалэ-м ты-дэ-кӀо, шъо пшъашъэ-р къы-шъу-дэ-кӀо
we boy-OBL 1PL-COM-go, you.PL girl-ABS VEN-2PL-COM-go
"We are going with the boy; the girl is coming with you."

=== 1st ↔ 2nd person: direction only, no inversion ===
Crucially, the role-swap happens only when a 3rd person is present. When the 1st and 2nd persons interact directly, neither is outranked by a third party, so къ~ contributes only a directional ("hither") nuance and leaves the subject–object relation intact:

Base form	Gloss	Translation	With къ(ы)~	Translation
Усфэд	[2SG.ABS-1SG.IO-like]	"you are like me"	Укъысфэд	"you are like me" (directional)
Сыпфэд	[1SG.ABS-2SG.IO-like]	"I am like you"	Скъыпфэд	"I am like you" (directional)
УсдэкӀо	[2SG.ABS-1SG.IO-COM-go]	"you go with me"	УкъысдэкӀо	"you come with me"
СыпдэкӀо	[1SG.ABS-2SG.IO-COM-go]	"I go with you"	СкъыпдэкӀо	"I come with you"

In short, къ(ы)~ always points to the top of the 1 > 2 > 3 scale: it reads as a plain directional whenever the two participants are both speech-act participants, but as a perspective-flipping inverse as soon as a 3rd person enters the picture.

=== The hierarchy across the verb classes ===
The same ranking can be read straight off the conjugation paradigms. Going through the singular person combinations, verb class by verb class, shows exactly where the venitive къэ- becomes obligatory.

==== Monovalent intransitive: no object to rank ====
With a single absolutive argument there is nothing to outrank, so the venitive keeps only its "toward here" sense and is optional for every person: Сэплъэ / Оплъэ / Маплъэ "I / you / he look(s)", each optionally taking къэ- (Сэплъэ → Сыкъэплъэ "I look this way", Маплъэ → Къэплъэ "he looks this way").

==== Bivalent intransitive: the clearest case ====
The subject is absolutive, the object oblique, and the directional tracks the hierarchy exactly (еплъын "to look at", present):

Subject → Object	Direct / inverse	Form
1 → 3 "I look at him"	direct	Сеплъы
2 → 3 "you look at him"	direct	Уеплъы
3 → 3 "he looks at him"	direct (tie)	Еплъы
1 → 2 "I look at you"	direct (1 > 2)	Сыоплъы
2 → 1 "you look at me"	inverse	Укъысэплъы
3 → 1 "he looks at me"	inverse	Къысэплъы
3 → 2 "he looks at you"	inverse	Къыоплъы

The three inverse cells obligatorily take the venitive къ-; the direct cells stay bare. The asymmetry between Укъысэплъы "you look at me" (2→1, marked) and Сыоплъы "I look at you" (1→2, unmarked) is the proof of the ranking: the action is flagged "hither" only when it climbs toward the higher-ranked person.

==== Bivalent transitive: no inverse gap ====
A transitive object is absolutive, not oblique, and here there is no inverse gap: even the would-be inverse cells keep a plain base form, the venitive remaining optional throughout (ылъэгъун "to see", present):

Subject → Object	Form
1 → 3 "I see him"	Сэлъэгъу
2 → 3 "you see him"	Олъэгъу
1 → 2 "I see you"	Усэлъэгъу
2 → 1 "you see me"	Сыолъэгъу
3 → 1 "he sees me"	Селъэгъу
3 → 2 "he sees you"	Уелъэгъу
3 → 3 "he sees him"	Елъэгъу

Adding къэ- (Сэлъэгъу → Къэсэлъэгъу "I see him [this way]") stays a free option in every cell. The hierarchy effect is thus tied to the oblique object slot.

==== Trivalent ditransitive: the indirect object ====
The oblique indirect object (recipient) behaves just like the bivalent-intransitive object (етын "to give", present, with the direct object "it" = 3SG):

Subject → Recipient	Direct / inverse	Form
1 → 3 "I give it to him"	direct	Есэты
2 → 3 "you give it to him"	direct	Еоты
3 → 3 "he gives it to him"	direct (tie)	Реты
1 → 2 "I give it to you"	direct (1 > 2)	Къыосэты
2 → 1 "you give it to me"	inverse	Къысэоты
3 → 1 "he gives it to me"	inverse	Къысеты
3 → 2 "he gives it to you"	inverse	Къыуеты

The inverse cells again carry къ-. The direct 1→2 "give it to you" optionally takes the directional toward the addressee (Къыосэты), reflecting that a gift naturally moves toward the person addressed.

In short: where the object is oblique (look at, give), the venitive къэ- is forced in every inverse combination; where it is absolutive (see), no such gap exists; and with no object (look) the venitive is just a free directional option.

== Direction ==
In Adyghe, verbal direction is indicated by a combination of prefixes and specific vowels within the verb stem (affixes).

- Towards (motion to): Typically marked by the prefix + the vowel э (/a/ or /e/).
- Away (motion from): Typically marked by the prefix + the vowel ы (/ə/).

=== Positional direction (affixes) ===
The following table illustrates these discontinuous affixes (circumfixes) for common verbs.

Base verb	Orientation	Towards (motion to)			Away (motion from)		
Base verb	Orientation	Affixes	Form	Meaning	Affixes	Form	Meaning
пкӀэн to jump	On	те-...-э-	тепкӀэн	to jump onto	те-...-ы-	тепкӀын	to jump off
пкӀэн to jump	Among	хэ-...-э-	хэпкӀэн	to jump into	хэ-...-ы-	хэпкӀын	to jump out of
пкӀэн to jump	Inside	и-...-э-	ипкӀэн	to jump in	и-...-ы-	ипкӀын	to jump out
дзын to throw	On	те-...-э-	тедзэн	to throw onto	те-...-ы-	тедзын	to throw off
дзын to throw	Among	хэ-...-э-	хэдзэн	to throw into	хэ-...-ы-	хэдзын	to throw out
дзын to throw	Inside	и-...-э-	идзэн	to throw inside	и-...-ы-	идзын	to throw out
плъэн to look	On	те-...-э-	теплъэн	to look onto	те-...-ы-	теплъын	to look from atop
плъэн to look	Among	хэ-...-э-	хэплъэн	to look into	хэ-...-ы-	хэплъын	to look out from
плъэн to look	Inside	и-...-э-	иплъэн	to look inside	и-...-ы-	иплъын	to look out from
тӀэрэн to drop	On	те-...-э-	тетӀэрэн	to drop onto	те-...-ы-	тетӀэрын	to drop off
тӀэрэн to drop	Among	хэ-...-э-	хэтӀэрэн	to drop into	хэ-...-ы-	хэтӀэрын	to drop out of
тӀэрэн to drop	Inside	и-...-э-	итӀэрэн	to drop inside	и-...-ы-	итӀэрын	to drop out of

==== Usage examples ====
Ӏанэм укъытемыпкӀагъэу сыкъытегъэпкӀыжь
Ӏанэ-м у-къы-те-мы-пкӀ-агъ-эу сы-къы-те-гъэ-пкӀы-жь
table-ERG 2SG-DIR-ON-NEG-jump-PST-ADV 1SG-DIR-ON-CAUS-jump-RE
"Before you jump on the table, let me jump off it."

МыӀэрысэхэр шхыныхэмэ къахэдз
МыӀэрысэ-хэ-р шхыны-хэ-мэ къ-а-хэ-дз
apple-PL-ABS food-PL-OBL DIR-3PL-AMONG-throw
"Remove (throw out) the apples from the foods."

Сэ апчым сыкъыхэплъы
Сэ апч-ым сы-къы-хэ-плъы
I glass-OBL 1SG-DIR-AMONG-look
"I am looking through the glass (from inside the mass of it)."
