= Chichewa tenses =

Grammatical features of Chichewa

Chichewa (also but less commonly known as Chinyanja, Chewa or Nyanja) is the main lingua franca of central and southern Malawi and neighbouring regions. Like other Bantu languages it has a wide range of tenses. In terms of time, Chichewa tenses can be divided into present, recent past, remote past, near future, and remote future. The dividing line between near and remote tenses is not exact, however. Remote tenses cannot be used of events of today, but near tenses can be used of events earlier or later than today.

The Chichewa tense system also incorporates aspectual distinctions. Except for the Present Simple, nearly every tense in Chichewa is either perfective (for example, "I went") or imperfective in aspect (for example "I was going", "I used to go"). In the present tense only, there is a distinction between habitual ("I usually go") and progressive ("I am going now").

Another aspectual distinction in Chichewa is that between perfect and past. A perfect tense is one which carries an implication that the result of a past action still holds at the present time, for example "he has come (and is still here)". The past tenses in Chichewa tend to be discontinuous, for example, "he came (but has now gone)". They differ from the English past tense, which is neutral in this regard.

The distinction between one tense and another in Chichewa is made partly by changing the tense-marker, which is an infix such as -ku-, -na-, -ma- etc. added to the verb, and partly by the use of tone. Often two different tenses, such as ndimapíta "I was going" and ndímapíta "I go", have the same tense-marker but are distinguished by their tonal pattern.

Compound tenses are also found in Chichewa to express more complex meanings, such as ndimatí ndipité "I was about to go" or ndakhala ndíkúpíta "I have been going".

In addition to ordinary tenses, Chichewa also has tenses to express obligation ("I should go"), potentiality ("I might go"), and persistence ("I am still going"). There are also tenses with meanings such as "while I am going", "after I had gone", "before I went", as well as a series of conditional-clause tenses meaning "if..." such as "if I go", "if I had gone", "if I were to go" and so on.

== Formation of the tenses ==
=== Basic tense formation ===
The distinction between one tense and another in Chichewa is made partly by varying the tonal pattern (each tense having its own particular tonal melody) and partly by the use of infixes such as -ku-, -ma-, -na-, -a-, -dza-, -ka-, -zi-. These infixes which distinguish the tenses are known as "tense-markers".

Three tenses (the Present Simple, Present Subjunctive, and Present Imperative) have no tense-marker. The Present Simple in most verbs has a near future meaning:

- ndí-thandiza "I (will) help"
- ndi-thandizé "I should help"
- thandiza! "help!"

Hyphens and tonal accent marks have been added for clarity, although they are not used in standard Chichewa orthography.

All other tenses have a tense-marker, which is added directly after the subject-marker. For example, the Present Continuous is made by adding the tense-marker -ku-. There are six possible subject-markers mostly referring to persons:

- ndi-ku-thándiza "I am helping"
- u-ku-thándiza "you (sg.) are helping"
- a-ku-thándiza "he or she is helping"
- ti-ku-thándiza "we are helping"
- mu-ku-thándiza "you (pl. or polite) are helping"
- a-ku-thándiza "they are helping / he or she (polite) is helping"

In modern standard Chichewa there is no difference between the 3rd person singular "he/she" and the 3rd person plural "they" except in the Perfect tense, although there are some dialects such as the Town Nyanja spoken in Lusaka, Zambia, where the 3rd person plural is still βa-, and thus differs from the singular. The singular and plural also differ in the Perfect tense (see below).

Freestanding pronouns such as ine "I", iwe "you", iyé "he, she" are available and may be added for emphasis, but are usually omitted: ine ndikuthándiza "I am helping".

In addition to the above subject-markers mostly referring mostly to persons there are also other subject-markers usually referring to things, animals, or the impersonal "it" or "there" of place or time:

- i-ku-thándiza "it is helping" (e.g. nkhúku "the chicken")
- chi-ku-thándiza "it is helping" (e.g. chímanga "maize")
- zi-ku-thándiza "they are helping" (e.g. mbúzi zangá "my goats")
- ku-ku-zízira "it is cold"

The Perfect tense is exceptional in that the subject-marker is shortened when followed by the tense-marker -a-. It is also exceptional in that the 3rd person singular has w- instead of a-, and is thus different from the 3rd person plural:

- nd-a-thandiza "I have helped"
- w-a-thandiza "you (sg.) have helped"
- w-a-thandiza "he/she has helped"
- t-a-thandiza "we have helped"
- mw-a-thandiza "you (pl. or polite) have helped"
- a-thandiza "they have helped" (or "he/she (polite) has helped")

Other elements can be added between the tense-marker and the verb-stem, such as aspect-markers and object-markers. For example the object-marker -m(u)- "him" or "her" can be added to any of the above verbs: nd-a-mú-thandiza "I have helped him/her".

== Tonal patterns ==
The second way in which one tense is distinguished from another in Chichewa is in the use of tones, that is, in the rise and fall in pitch of the speaker's voice. Each tense is associated with a particular tonal melody, and in some cases two tenses which share the same tense-marker can be distinguished by tones.

In their book, The Phonology of Chichewa, Downing and Mtenje identify eight different patterns for positive verbs, in addition to further patterns for negative and relative clause verbs.

Often the same tonal pattern is used by more than one tense. For instance, the Present Continuous, Recent Past, and Imperfect all have a high tone on the syllable following the tense-marker:

ndi-ku-thándiza "I am helping"
ndi-na-thándiza "I helped (just now)"
ndi-ma-thándiza "I was helping"

Another tonal pattern, used in the Present Habitual tense, is to place one high tone on the subject-marker and another on the penultimate syllable:

ndí-ma-thandíza "I (usually) help"

The Past Simple (Remote Perfect) has a tone on the tense-marker itself, which in some dialects spreads to the following syllable:

ndi-ná-thandiza or ndi-ná-thándiza "I helped"

Some tenses, such as the Potential, are pronounced with every syllable low:

ndi-nga-thandize "I can help"

The same tonal pattern is used in every verb. However, when the verb is a short one of one or two syllables only, certain adjustments may be made. For example, in the Present Habitual, the second tone is heard on the final when the verb stem has only one syllable:

ndí-ma-werénga "I usually read" (second tone on the penultimate)
ndí-ma-dyá "I usually eat" (second tone on the final)

But in certain tenses, a penultimate tone remains penultimate, even if the verb is monosyllabic:

s-a-na-píte "he has not yet gone"
s-a-ná-dye "he has not yet eaten"

For further details concerning the tonal patterns of verbs of different lengths, see the article Chichewa tones.

In negative tenses different tonal patterns are used. For example, in the negative subjunctive, the tone moves to the penultimate:

mu-pité "you should go"
mu-sa-píte "you shouldn't go"

Some tenses have two different negative intonations, depending on the meaning. For example, the Simple Past (Remote Perfect) ndi-ná-gula "I bought" has the following negatives with different meanings:

sí-ndí-na-gúle (or sí-ndi-na-gúle) "I didn't buy it"
si-ndi-na-gúle "I haven't bought it yet"

Certain tenses also have a different tonal pattern when used in a positive relative clause. For example, the potential tense is normally toneless, but in a relative clause it acquires a tone on the first and penultimate syllables. The tone of an object-marker such as -tí- below is lost:

a-nga-tí-fotokozere "they can explain to us"
(améné) á-nga-ti-fotokozére "who can explain to us"

Not all tenses change their tonal pattern in a relative clause. Negative tenses do not change, and those positive tenses which already have a tone on the first syllable do not change.

In addition to the tones added to the verb by the tonal pattern of the tense, some verb-stems and certain suffixes have their own tone, which is heard on the final syllable. This tone is not heard, however, in tenses such as the Present Habitual where the tonal pattern places a tone on the penultimate syllable. The distinction is also lost in the subjunctive, where the tonal pattern places a tone on the final even in low-toned stems:

nda-thandiza "I have helped"
nda-thamangá "I have run"
ndí-ma-thandíza "I usually help"
ndí-ma-thamánga "I usually run"
ndi-thandizé "I should help"
ndi-thamangé "I should run"

Another factor affecting the tones of a verb is that when a verb is followed by an object or a place-argument, the tone usually spreads:

mú-ma-khála "you stay"
mú-ma-khálá kuti? "where do you live?"

== Aspect-Markers ==
Following the tense-marker it is possible to add one or more aspect-markers, which are infixes which modify the meaning of the tense. There are four commonly used aspect-markers, which when combined are usually added in the order: -ma-, -ka-, -dza-, -ngo-. A fifth aspect-marker ba(a) is less commonly found.

=== -ma- ===
-Ma- can be used in its own right as a tense-marker to make the imperfect tense:

Ndimathándiza "I was helping" (with tone on the syllable following -ma-)

It can also be added to other tenses or to the infinitive to make the aspect habitual:

Usachíte "don't do", vs. usamáchíté "don't keep on doing"
Ndikagula "if I buy", vs. ndikamágúlá "whenever I buy"
Ndíthándiza "I'll help", vs. ndímathandíza "I help regularly"
Kuthándiza "to help", vs. kumáthandíza "to help regularly"

It is not combined with the perfect tense, or with any of the tenses with -na-, -naa- or -da-, -daa-, since these tenses are always perfective in aspect.

=== -ka- ===
The meaning of -ka- is usually "go and...".

adákágula pétulo "he went and bought some petrol"

Sometimes it can mean "go in order to":

tidzápemphera "we will pray" vs. tidzákápemphera "we will go and pray"

In combination with the Present Simple tense it makes the Contingent Future (see below):

mwína ákándithandiza.
"perhaps he'll help me (if I ask him)."

=== -dza- ===
The infix -dza- has various meanings. The first meaning is "come and...":

dzaonéni! "come and see!"

With an Infinitive or Subjunctive after a verb of coming, it can mean "in order to":

kuthándiza "to help" vs. ndabwera kudzáthandizá "I have come to help".

The second meaning is or "at a later time, in future":

zikadámúvuta "it would have caused him problems" vs. zikadádzámúvuta "it would have caused him problems later"

When combined with the Present Simple tense, it converts it to the Remote Future:

ndídzáthandiza "I will help" (tomorrow or later)

=== -ngo- ===
The aspect-marker -ngo- means "just". As it is derived from the Infinitive, the tone, as in the Infinitive itself, goes on the syllable following -ngo-, and the final vowel is always -a, never -e:

Ndimafúna "I wanted", vs. Ndimángofúna "I just wanted".

=== -ba- ===
Another much less commonly used aspect-marker is -ba- or -baa-, which can be added to the present tense, subjunctive, or imperative. Mchombo gives this example:

Inu tsogolani, ine ndíbámalízá ntchítoyi.
"You go ahead, while I (continue to) complete this job."

Downing and Mtenje call this aspect the "continuative", and write the infix as -báa. The similarity in meaning suggests that it may derive from the idiom ndíyamba ndámálizá "I'll begin by finishing".

For examples of this aspect-marker used with the subjunctive and imperative, see below.

== Time and aspect of tenses ==
Chichewa makes distinctions which are sometimes not found in other languages, for example, the distinction between near and remote past, or between perfective and imperfect aspect. Some tenses, such as the toneless -ka- tense, are used only to make conditional or temporal clauses.

=== Near and remote tenses ===
Certain tenses in Chichewa, such as those with -ná-, -nká- and -dzá-, are used for events remote in time, while others are used mainly for events of today (including last night). However, although the remote tenses are never used for events of today, the opposite is not true. As one scholar Jack Mapanje puts it: "Although traditional and other grammarians have latched on to the idea of immediate, near or remote past or future time, this is not a hard and fast rule for our languages. Usually the decision as to how immediate, near or remote past or future time is from the speech time is dependent on subjective factors."

== Present tenses ==
=== Present Simple ===
The Present Simple tense is formed without any tense-marker, but with a tone on the subject-prefix: ndíthandiza "I will help". In a verb of three or more syllables, the first tone often spreads, making ndíthándiza.

The Present Simple of the verb -li ("is") is irregular, in that it has no tone on the subject prefix: ndili "I am". But the tone on the first syllable is heard when the verb is used in a relative clause.

The Present Simple tense can be both perfective and imperfective in aspect. When the Present Simple is perfective, the meaning is usually immediate future (see below):

Ndínyamula katúndu, musavutíke.
"I'll carry the bags, don't trouble yourself."

It can sometimes, however, be used perfectively referring to the present, for example in stage directions in a play:

Télala átuluka m'sitólo.
"The tailor comes out of the shop."

It is also possible for the Present Simple to have an imperfective meaning. This was common in early Chichewa, but avoided today, as these two versions of the Bible illustrate:

Mphépo íomba pomwé ífuna. (1922 translation)
"The wind blows where it will."
Mphépo ímaombéra komwé íkúfúna. (1998 translation)
"The wind blows where it will (lit. usually blows to where it is wanting)."

With a non-dynamic verb such as "I love", "I know", "I want", "I believe", "I hope" and so on, the Present Simple can be used even today with present meaning:

Ndíkhúlupirira muli bwino.
"I believe (I hope) you are well."

However, even with these verbs, it is more common these days to use the Present Continuous or Present Habitual instead.

=== Negative Present Simple ===
The Negative Present Simple tense (with tones on the first two syllables) can be used for the negative of a stative verb:

Ine síndídziwa kuyéndetsa gálímoto.
"I don't know how to drive a car."

At other times it has a habitual meaning, and some authors consider it as being the negative of the Present Habitual. In the following example, the Present Habitual is used for the positive, but the Present Simple for the negative:

Nthénjere tímadyá koma nthúla sítidya.
"We eat sour-plums but we don't eat bitter-apples."

With negative monosyllabic verbs, the present continuous is sometimes used, even though the meaning is habitual:

Amaláwi ámbíri sákumwá mowa.
"Many Malawians don't drink alcohol."

However, sámwá and sámámwá are also possible here.

When the negative present simple has a future meaning, the tones change, and in common with other future tenses it has a single tone on the penultimate: si-ndi-thandíza "I won't help".

In relative clauses, both negative and positive, the tones are the same as in ordinary statements.

=== Present Habitual (-ma-) ===
The Present Habitual tense (ndí-ma-thandíza "I help, habitually") is formed by adding -ma- to the Present Simple tense. The tones are on the subject-marker and penultimate; the first tone never spreads. In relative clauses the tones do not change.

The Present Habitual is typically used for situations in the present which are repeated habitually or which are continuous and expected to continue indefinitely:

Mvúlá ikagwa, mitsínje ímadzála.
"When it rains, the rivers get full."
Ndímakhálá ku Lilongwe.
"I live in Lilongwe."

As noted above, the negative of this tense usually omits -ma-. However, the infix -má- (with a tone) can be added especially if the meaning is emphatic:

Síndímádandaulá.
"I never complain".

The tense-marker -ma- appears to derive from an earlier -mba-. (-mba- is also used as a habitual marker in the Malawian variety of Chisena.) Kanerva (1990) records forms like ndíímaphíika "I cook", showing a long vowel in the first syllable in the Nkhotakota dialect; however, other dialects have a short vowel.

=== Present Continuous (-ku-) ===
The Present Continuous (or Present Progressive) tense uses the tense-marker -ku-, with the tone on the syllable immediately after -ku-: ndi-ku-thándiza "I am helping". The negative also has a tone in the same place: sí-ndí-ku-thándiza "I am not helping". (Since -ku- can also mean "you (sg.)", these words, with the intonation ndíkúthandiza and sindikuthandíza, can also mean "I will help you" and "I won't help you".)

It is used much like the English present continuous for temporary situations which are not expected to continue for long. It can also be used, as in English, for events which are already planned, e.g. "I'm going to Zambia next week" or which are still incompleted but under way:

Ndikupítá ku msika.
"I'm going to the market." (now)
Ndikupítá kwáthu máwa.
"I'm going home tomorrow."
Iyé akumángá khítchini kwáwo.
"He's building a kitchen at his house."

This tense is used in a wider range of contexts than the English equivalent, since it is also often used with stative verbs such as "know", "want", "remember", "believe", "expect", "think", "see":

Ukugániza kutí síndikudzíwa?
"Do you think that I don't know?"
Ukuthánthauza chiyáni?
"What do you mean?"

It is also used for performative verbs, such as ndikulónjeza "I promise", although some older speakers use the Present Simple in such contexts.

In some contexts the Present Continuous can be used where English uses the Perfect Continuous:

Chigwetséreni ndalámayo zinthu zikuthína.
"Since the devaluation of the currency things have been getting difficult."

The longer form of this tense, ndinalí kuthándiza or ndínalí kuthándiza, mentioned in some older books, is not often used nowadays, the simpler form being much more common.

=== Present Frequentative (-kumá-) ===
A frequentative version of the Present Continuous tense can be made by combining the tense-marker -ku- with the aspect-marker -má-. It is generally used for situations which the speaker disapproves of. Again, the addition of -ma- is emphatic. The tones are on -ma- and the penultimate:

Akumásokoséra ndí máwáilesi.
"They are always causing a disturbance with radios."

=== Present Persistive (-kada-) ===
This tense is formed with the tense-marker -kada-, -kana-, or -daka- and a single tone on the penultimate syllable: ndikadathandíza or ndidakathandíza "I am still helping". (This tone moves to the final in monosyllabic verbs.) It is most often used with the verb -li "be". With other verbs the tendency is to replace this tense with the suffix -be "still": ndikuthándizábe "I am still helping", but this suffix is not available with the verb -li, since ndilíbe has a different meaning, namely "I do not have".

Mwanáyo akadavutíka.
"The girl is still suffering."
Malipiro akadalí wótsíka.
"Wages are still low."

Sometimes the tense-marker -kada- is shortened to -ka-.

Another way of expressing "still" is a form in chi-...-re, but this is used only for a few verbs. The verb has a tone on the penultimate:

Ali chigonére.
"She's still in bed."
Taxí ndináyípézá ílí chiyimíre.
"I found the taxi still waiting."

For the participial form of the persistive tense, see below.

== Perfect tense ==
A perfect tense is usually defined as one which indicates the continuing present relevance of a past situation. Thus the use of the Perfect tense in the sentence "I have lost my penknife" indicates that the penknife is still missing.

Several different typical uses of perfect tenses are distinguished in linguistics textbooks: the Perfect of Result (e.g. "I have lost my penknife"); the Experiential Perfect (e.g. "Bill has been to America (at least once)"); the Perfect of Persistent Situation (e.g. "I've been waiting for hours"); and the Perfect of Recent Past (e.g. "I've seen her this morning"). All of these uses can be found in the Chichewa Perfect.

In English, the use of the Perfect is incompatible with a time adverb referring to a time completely in the past (e.g. "yesterday"). However, this is not necessarily the case in all languages; in Spanish, for example, the Perfect is compatible with an adverb such as ayer "yesterday". As will be seen below, Chichewa may also combine the Perfect with a past time adverb.

The Perfect Simple tense in Chichewa is formed as described above with the tense-marker -a-, e.g. nd-a-gula "I have bought (some)". It is toneless, unless the verb-stem itself has a tone (e.g. nd-a-topá "I am tired"). There is no exact negative, although a particular intonation of the negative past with the tone on the penultimate only is often regarded as the equivalent of a negative Perfect (si-ndi-na-gúle "I haven't bought it yet").

=== Perfect of result ===
As with the English Perfect, the Perfect tense is often used as a perfect of result, usually referring to very recent events:

Máyo! Sélula yángá yabedwa!
"Oh no! My phone's been stolen!" (implying that it is still lost)

Unlike the English Perfect, it is possible to combine it with an adverb of time such as "at ten o'clock":

Tamúpézá pa téni koloko.
"We found him at ten o'clock."

=== Perfect of experience ===
As in English also it can be used as a Perfect of experience to describe something which has happened once or more and which may happen again:

Ndapitánsó ku Chitípa katátu.
"I've been back to Chitipa three times."

Adding the suffix -po gives the meaning "at times" or "sometimes":

Ine ndaonápo anthu ákúchíta izi.
"I myself have at times seen people doing this."

=== Perfect with present meaning ===
A usage of the perfect tense unfamiliar in English but common in other Bantu languages such as Swahili is to express a present state resulting from a recent event. For example, "he is wearing a suit" is expressed in Chichewa as "he has put on a suit"; "he is sitting on a chair" is expressed as "he has sat down on a chair"; "I am tired" is expressed as "I have become tired", and so on.

Wavala súti.
"He's wearing a suit." (literally "he has put on a suit")
Mangó aja apsa.
"Those mangoes are ripe." (lit. "have ripened")
Ndatopá.
"I am tired." (lit. "I have become tired")
Wakhala m'khítchini.
"She's sitting in the kitchen (right now)"
Zatheká bwánji?
"How is it possible?"
Ndalámazi zachepa.
"This money is (too) little."
Anthu achuluka.
"There are (too) many people."
Kukhála m'nyumbá zá údzú ndí zámálata kwasiyaná bwánji?
"How is living in a grass-roofed house different from living in one with a tin roof?"

To express the past version of such situations ("he was wearing a suit") the Recent Past or Remote Past is used.

=== Perfect continuous meaning ===
The Perfect tense of the verb -khala ("stay" or "be") either by itself or combined with another verb is used as the equivalent of the English Perfect Continuous to express a situation which began some time ago but which is still continuing now:

Ndakhala pano (kwá) miyezí isanu.
"I've been here for five months."
Takhala tíkúgwíra ntchíto kuyámbira Lólémba.
"We've been working since Monday."
Akhala chiimíre kwá máólá ámbíri.
"He has been standing for many hours."

The construction using forms such as takhala tíkúgíra is not mentioned in any of the early writers on Chichewa grammar and so is perhaps a recent development in Chichewa.

=== Relative clause intonation of Perfect ===
The relative clause intonation of the Perfect Simple has a tone on the first syllable (which may link or spread) and another on the penultimate (which may shift).

It may be used as an adjective:

Chaká chátha.
"Last year (lit. the year which has finished)."
Mwezí wápítáwo.
"Last month (lit. that month which has gone)."

It can also be used as a noun, with the noun it describes being understood:

Wámwáliráyo.
"The deceased (person)."
Wákhálá pampando ndaní?
"The (person) sitting on the chair is who?"
Mwátsékuláyi ndi Z.B.S.
"This (radio station) which you have opened is Z.B.S.", i.e. "You are listening to the Z.B.S."

Thirdly it can be used in a construction with any tense of the verb yamba "begin" to mean "begin by doing":

Yambani mwádyá nsíma, tikambirané.
"Eat some nsíma first, then let's talk." (literally, "begin (when) you have eaten nsíma")
Tísadanéne chína chílíchonsé tiyambé támúoná munthuyo.
"Before we say anything else, let's start by seeing the girl."

== Remote Perfect (Simple Past) ==
=== -ná- and -dá- ===
The Remote Perfect (or Past Simple) tense (e.g. ndinábwera or ndidábwera "I came") uses the tense-marker -ná- or -dá-. The difference is partly regional, since -dá- is heard mainly in parts of the Central Region, especially in the area around Lilongwe, while -na- is used in the Southern Region. Since the first President of Malawi, Hastings Kamuzu Banda, wished to standardise the language and to make the Central Region variety the basis of that standard, -da- was chosen as the correct form to be used in written Chichewa for this tense. Banda is said to have declared: "The real Chichewa is what is spoken by the villagers in Dowa, Lilongwe, Dedza, Salima; in the Southern Region, Namkumba's area in Fort Johnston." Thus -da- has come to be used as the standard form in written Chichewa, and books describing the language for Malawian schools allow only -da- as the Remote Perfect tense-marker. Colloquially, however, -ná- seems to be more common, and is the form given for this tense in the majority of publications describing Chichewa grammar. In the older 1922 translation of the Bible, -na- is more commonly used than -da- (although -da- is used occasionally), whereas in the more recent translation of 1998, -da- is the usual past tense marker except for the Recent Past.

The tone is on the tense-marker itself. In longer verbs in some dialects this tone spreads forward one syllable: a-ná-landira / a-ná-lándira "he/she (has) received". In relative clauses, the tones are on the first syllable and penultimate: á-na-landíra or á-ná-landíra "(he who) received".

This tense is sometimes referred to as the "Past" or "Simple Past". However, the descriptions given by several authors make it clear that, except in its use in narrative, it should be classified as one of the perfect tenses, since like the Perfect it usually carries the implication that the effect of the action still holds. Watkins calls it the "Remote Past With Present Influence". It refers to events of yesterday or earlier.

=== Remote Perfect of result ===
One common use is as a perfect of result, referring to an event which happened before today, but whose result is still true at the time of speaking:

Anábwera.
"He came some time ago (and is still here)."
Adápita kumudzi.
"He went home (supposes that he did not turn back)."
Adádya.
"He has eaten (and is not now hungry)"

It can be used with a past time adverb such as "yesterday" or "last year". "When this happens the 'perfect meaning' of the utterance is not lost" (Mapanje).

Anáfa chaká chátha.
"He died last year."

As Watkins noted, this is the appropriate tense to use to describe the creation of the world, since the result of the creation is still evident:

Pachiyámbi Mulungu adálenga kumwambá ndí dzíkó lápánsí.
"In the beginning God created the heaven and the earth."

The Remote Perfect can also be used with adverbs such as masíkú ano "these days" and "pano "at present" to describe a change that has come about, but not recently:

Masíkú ano mpira unásintha kwámbíri.
"These days football has changed a lot."
Pano zidáchepa.
"Nowadays these things have become rare."

=== Remote Perfect of experience ===
Like the Perfect, it can also be used experientially. In this sense, often -po or -ko is added to the verb.

Ndinákhala ku África kawíri.
"I have lived in Africa twice."
Ndidákumana náye mwamúnayo kamódzi.
"I met this man once only."
A Chibambo adáphunzitsápo m'sukúlú zá sékondale zósíyanásiyaná.
"Chibambo has taught in various secondary schools."

=== Remote Perfect in narrative ===
Another use is in narrative:

Ndinkáyéndá m'nkhalangó. Mwádzídzidzi ndidáponda njóka.
"I was walking in the forest. Suddenly I stepped on a snake."

The narrative Remote Perfect is typically used for the action in novels and short stories and in narratives such as the 1998 Bible translation. In this usage, it has the meaning of a simple past tense, and the implication that the result of the action still holds does not apply.

=== Negative of the Remote Perfect ===
The negative of this tense has the final vowel -e. There are two different intonations with different meanings. The second of these, which has a tone on the penultimate syllable only, serves as the negative of the perfect tense:

Síndínapíte.
"I didn't go."
Sindinapíte.
"I haven't gone."

The second of these intonations is also used when the Remote Perfect is used experientially:

Sindinapítépó.
"I have never been."

The first of these intonations has tones on both the negative prefix sí- and the subject marker. In the 3rd person singular and plural, the syllables sí-á- usually coalesce to sá-:

Sánabwére.
"He didn't come."
Sanabwére.
"He hasn't come yet."

In monosyllabic verbs the intonations are as follows:

Sánadyé.
"He didn't eat."
Sanádye.
"He hasn't eaten yet."

Since the negative of the Recent Past is rarely used in modern Chichewa, the Remote Perfect negative is used instead. When negative, therefore, this tense can refer to events of today as well as events in the more remote past.

=== Relative clause intonation ===
When used in a relative clause, the intonation of the verb changes, with one tone on the first syllable (which may spread) and one on the penultimate, which is shifted to the final when the verb has two syllables or one. An object-marker, if present, loses its tone except if the verb is monosyllabic.

Tidálandira kálata iyi iméné múdalembá.
"We received this letter which you wrote."
Sákudzíwa chomwé chínamúpha mchemwalí wákéyo.
"He does not know what killed his sister."

== Past tenses ==
The past tenses in Chichewa differ from the perfect tenses in that they generally describe situations which were true in the past but of which the results no longer apply at the present time. Thus Maxson describes the Recent Past and the Remote Past as both implying that the situation has been "reversed or interrupted by another action". According to Watkins, the Remote Past tense would be appropriate in a sentence such as "Jesus Christ died (but rose again)"; whereas it would not be appropriate in the sentence "God created the world" since it would imply that the creation was cancelled and "a second creator did a more enduring piece of work". Similarly, according to Kulemeka, the Recent Past would be inappropriate in a sentence such as "our cat died", since it would imply that the act of dying was not permanent but would allow the possibility that the cat could come to life again at some future time.

These two tenses, therefore, appear to differ from the English past tense (which is neutral in implication), and would seem to belong to the category of past tenses known in modern linguistics as discontinuous past. Just as the Perfect and the Past Simple both carry the implication that the action had an enduring effect which continues to the present time, so the Recent Past and Remote Past carry the opposite implication, that the action was not permanent but was reversed or cancelled by a later action.

The Recent Past tense can also be used for narrating events that occurred earlier on the day of speaking. (The use of the Perfect tense for narrative as described by Watkins is now apparently obsolete). However, for narrating a series of events of yesterday or earlier, the Remote Perfect tense is used.

=== Recent Past (-na-) ===
The Recent Past is made with the tense-marker -na-. The tone comes on the syllable immediately after -na-: ndinathándiza "I helped (but...)".

For the Recent Past tense, -na- is preferred. -da- is regarded as incorrect by Malawian teachers for events of today, but is sometimes heard colloquially.

The Recent Past is most often used for events of today, but it can also be used of earlier events. Although it can be used for simple narrative of events of earlier today, it usually carries the implication that the result of the action no longer holds true:

Anapítá ku Zombá, koma wabweráko.
"He went to Zomba, but he has come back."
Ndinaíká m'thumba.
"I (had) put it in my pocket (but it isn't there now)."
Anabwéra.
"He came just now (but has gone away again)."

With the same verbs in which the Perfect tense describes a state in the present, the Recent Past describes a state in the recent past:

Anaválá súti (= Analí átáválá súti).
"He was wearing a suit" (literally, "he had put on a suit").
Anakhálá pafúpi.
"He was sitting nearby."
Kodí bambo, munanyámula munthu wína áliyensé m'gálímoto?
"Were you carrying anyone else in the car, sir?"

It can also be used, however, as a simple past tense for narrative of events of earlier today:

Ndimayéndá m'nkhalangó. Mwádzídzidzi ndinapóndá njóka.
"I was walking in the forest. Suddenly I stepped on a snake."

Although the tenses with -na- are usually perfective, the verb -li "be" is exceptional since the Recent Past and Remote Past in this tense usually have an imperfective meaning:

Ndinalí wókóndwa kwámbíri.
"I was very pleased."

A negative form of this tense (síndínafótókoza "I didn't explain", with a tone following na, and with the ending -a) is recorded by Mtenje. However, the negative seems to be rarely if ever used in modern standard Chichewa, and it is not mentioned by most other writers. Instead, the negative of the Remote Perfect (síndínafotokóze, with tones on the first and penultimate, and with the ending -e) is generally used.

=== Remote Past (-dáa- / -náa-) ===
For the Remote Past tense, some dialects use -naa- and others -daa-. In some books, such as the 1998 Bible translation, Buku Loyera, this tense-marker is always spelled -daa-, but in other publications the spelling -na- or -da- is used, so that only the context makes it clear whether the Past Simple or the Remote Past is intended.

There are tones on the 1st, 2nd, and penultimate syllables. The first tone or the second tone can be omitted: ndi-ná-a-gúla; ndí-na-a-gúla "I (had) bought (but...)". This tense is a remote one, used of events of yesterday or earlier. The a of the tense-marker is always long, even though it is often written with a single vowel.

As might be expected of a tense which combines the past tense marker -na- or -da- and the Perfect tense marker -a-, this tense can have the meaning of a Pluperfect:

Mkatí mwá chítupamo ádâdíndá chilolezo.
"Inside the passport they had stamped a visa."
Khamú lálíkúlu lidámtsatira, chifukwá lídáaóná zizindikiro zózízwitsa.
"A large crowd followed him, because they had seen amazing signs."

It can also be used to describe a situation in the distant past, using the same verbs which are used in the Perfect tense to describe a situation in the present:

Kunjáko kúdâyíma máyi wónénepa. Mmanja ádanyamúla páketi yá mowa.
"A fat woman was standing outside; in her hand she was carrying a packet of beer."
Ndidápézá msúngwana wína átátámbalalá pamchenga. Ádâválá chitenje.
"I found certain girl sitting on the sand; she was wearing a chitenje."

The same meaning is often expressed with a compound verb: adáli átávála chitenje (see below for examples.)

Another common use of this tense is as a discontinuous past, expressing a situation in the past which later came to be cancelled or reversed:

Ndídáalandírá makúponi koma ndidágulitsa.
"I received some coupons but I sold them."
Anzáke ádáamulétsa, iyé sádamvére.
"Her friends tried to stop her but she wouldn't listen."
Nkhósa ídáatayíka.
"The sheep was lost (but has been found)."
Ádáabádwa wósapénya.
"He was born blind (but has regained his sight)."

=== Imperfect tense (-ma-) ===
The usual Past Imperfective tense, or simply the Imperfect tense, is made with the tense-marker -ma-. The tones are the same as for the Present Continuous and the Recent Past, that is, there is a tone on the syllable immediately after -ma. The negative also has a tone after -ma-: síndímathándiza "I wasn't helping". This tense can refer either to very recent time or to remote time in the past:

The imperfect sometimes has a progressive meaning:

Ndikhúlúlukiréni. Ndimalákwa.
"Forgive me. I was doing wrong."
Haaa! Kodí ndimalóta?
"Ha! Was I dreaming?"
Ntháwi iméneyo umachókera kuti?
"At that time where were you coming from?"

It can also be used for habitual events in the past:

M'kalási timakhálira limódzi.
"In class we used to sit together."

The negative also has a tone on the syllable following the infix -ma-, as well as one on si-:

Síndímadzíwa kutí mwafika.
"I didn't know that you had arrived."

=== Remote Imperfect (-nká-) ===
Remote Imperfect or Remote Past Imperfective is formed with the tense-marker -nka-. There are tones on nká and on the penultimate: ndinkáthandíza "I was helping/ used to help". It refers to events of yesterday or earlier. Since the Past Imperfective with -ma- can be used of both near and remote events, whereas -nka- can be used only for remote ones, the -nka- tense is perhaps less commonly used.

This tense is used for both habitual events in the distant past, and progressive events in the distant past:

Chaká chátha ankápítá kusukúlu, koma chaká chino amángokhála.
"Last year he used to go to school, but this year he just stays at home."
Ndinkáyéndá m'nkhalangó.
"I was walking in the forest."

The tense-marker -nká-, which is pronounced with two syllables, is possibly derived from the verb muká or mká 'go'.

== Future tenses ==
=== Present Simple as future ===
The Present Simple, as noted above, is often used for events in the near or immediate future:

Ndíyimba fóni ndikafika.
"I'll give you a ring when I arrive."

Usually it refers to events of today, but it can also be used for tomorrow or even later times:

Tíkúmana máwa.
"We'll meet tomorrow."
Máwa úkhala bwino. Ndikulónjeza.
"You'll be fine tomorrow, I promise."

The negative of this tense has a single tone on the penultimate syllable:

Ine sindipíta kuukwati.
"I'm not going to go to the wedding."

=== -dzá- ===
For events in a "general or more distant future (not today)" the Future Tense with -dza- is used. Some dialects put a tone on the first two syllables (e.g. ndídzáthándiza "I will help"); more frequently authors report a tone on -dzá- only (ndidzáthandiza); Downing & Mtenje (2017), pp. 163–4. In longer verbs the tone of -dza- may spread to the following syllable.

Tsíku lína nánénsó ndidzákhala mtolankháni.
"One day I too am going to be a reporter."
Ukamaliza sukúlu udzápangánji?
"What are you going to do when you leave school?"
Ine ndídzákúkondá moyo wánga wónse.
"I will love you all my life."
Ádzádyá chiyáni nyengo yókólola?
"What are they going to eat at harvest time?"

In the negative, as with most negative future tenses, there is a single tone on the penultimate (in monosyllables the tone is heard on -dzá-). All other tones earlier in the word are deleted. Often the meaning of this negative tense is "will never":

Ife sitidzamuiwála.
"We will never forget him."

Adding -nso to this tense gives the meaning "never again":

Kuchókera pomwépo ndidálumbira kutí sindidzágwánsó m'chikóndi.
"From that time on I swore that I would never again fall in love."

=== -ká- ===
Another future tense is formed with -ka-, with the same tones as -dza-. It usually refers to events in the near future. Maxson characterises this tense as follows: "The sense sometimes seems to be that the action will take place in relation to or dependent on something else. It might presuppose an unspoken conditional clause." The name "Contingent Future" was suggested by Henry (1891), as opposed to the -dza- Future, which he called the "Indefinite Future".

Mukándípezá kuntchíto.
"You'll find me at work (when you come)."
Makíyi mukáwápezá ndí álónda.
"You'll find the keys with the security guards (if you go there)."
Mwína akándithandiza.
"Perhaps he'll help me (if I ask him)."

The future tense-marker -ka- is not to be confused with the aspect-marker -ka- "go and", which can be used combined with various tenses, for example:

Ndikátenga pa bánki.
"I'll go and get it from the bank."

=== -zi- ===
Another future tense can be made with the tense-marker -zi-, with tones on the initial syllable and penultimate. This usually refers to a situation in the near future, and has an imperfective meaning:

Sitíma ízinyamúka.
"The train will be leaving soon."

In the negative, the tones are on -zi- and on the penultimate syllable:

Sazíyimíránsó Maláwi.
"He will not be representing Malawi again."

In some dialects, -zi- in this tense and the Imperfect Subjunctive becomes -dzi-.

=== -zidza- ===
The -zidza- Future is an imperfective tense referring to events that will regularly take place in the distant future. The tones are on the initial syllable (which may spread) and the penultimate:

Idzákhala ntchító yánji? Ndízidzalandírá ndaláma zingáti?
"What sort of work will it be? How much money will I be getting?"

The tense-marker -zika- is sometimes used in place of -zidza-, perhaps with the implication that the events will take place elsewhere:

Tízíkádya maúngu.
"We will be going to eat pumpkins."

These two tenses, -zidza- and -zika-, can also be used in temporal clauses referring to future time (see below).

=== -madza- ===
Another tense referring to events in the distant future is -madza-, which means "it will usually happen". The tones are on the initial and penultimate syllables:

Munthu wódzítukumúla ndí wódzíthémbá tsíkú líná ámadzamutsítsa.
"When a person is arrogant and overconfident it will usually happen that one day he will be brought down to earth."
Chówúlúká chímakhála ndí tsíkú limódzi lomwé chímadzatéra.
"Something that flies generally has one day when it will usually happen that it will come down to land."

== Potential tenses ==
=== Present Potential (-nga-) ===
The Present Potential is made with the tense-marker -nga- and the final vowel -e-. It is toneless, unless the verb-stem itself has a tone.

Although sometimes referring to the present, this tense more often refers to something that might happen in the future. It can be translated "can", "could", "may", or "might":

Kodí mungandíthandize?
"Could you help me?"
Ndingabwerekéko njíngá yánû?
"Could I borrow your bike?"
Yendetsani bwino njingá, mungagunde mténgo.
"Ride the bike carefully, in case you crash into a tree."
Ndikuópa kutí angandímenye.
"I am scared that he might hit me."

The negative has tones on the tense-marker and penultimate: sindingáthandíze "I can't help"; there is an alternative pronunciation: síndíngathandíze.

Sindingávomerézé ziménezo.
"I can't agree to that."

The relative clause form of this tense has tones on the first and penultimate syllables:

Palíbe chomwé ángachíte.
"There is nothing he can do."

Frequently this tense is used with the verb -tha "be able":

Mungathe kupítá kwánu.
"You can go home."

The aspect-marker -dza- can be added to this tense: angadzáthandize "he might one day help".

In conditional clauses referring to a hypothetical situation in the future, -nga- can mean "would". (See below.)

=== Perfect Potential (-kadá-) ===
This tense is made with -kadá-, -kaná-, or -daká-. There is a tone on the second syllable of the tense-marker. The meaning is "I would have done", "I could have done".

Ndikadáthandiza.
"I would have helped."

The negative is síndíkadáthandiza "I would not have helped".

Sákadáchitira mwína koma kutháwa
"He had no option but to run away." (Literally, "he couldn't have done differently.")

Sometimes the aspect-marker -ma- is added to this tense to make it imperfective. It adds an extra tone on the penultimate:

Ndikanámathandíza.
"I would be helping; I could have been helping".
Akutíphangirá mwayi wóchítá malónda áng'ónoang'óno améne tíkanamachíta ife Amaláwi.
"They are depriving us of the opportunity to do small businesses which we Malawians could have been doing ourselves."

The aspect markers -ká- and -dzá- may also be added: ndikadádzáthándiza "I would have helped later".

Adádziŵa kutí ngati chílichonsé chíkadachitíka, zikadádzámúvuta.
"He knew that if anything were to happen, it would cause him problems later."

Further information is given under Conditional Clauses below.

== Subjunctive ==
=== Present subjunctive ===
The present subjunctive has no tense-marker; the final vowel changes to -e, which has a tone, for example ndithandizé "I should help". When an object-marker is added to the subjunctive, there is another tone following the object-marker, e.g. mundifótokozeré "please explain to me". In shorter verbs the tones are: mundithándízé "please help me", mundipátse "please give me", muzídye "please eat them".

The subjunctive usually expresses "either an order, or a wish, or an invitation to do something." It can be a polite form of the imperative, or be used as the imperative of the 3rd person, or make suggestions for the 1st person:

Mundipátse.
"Please give it to me."
Abweré msánga!
"Let him come at once!" (an order, not permission).
Tipité kuti?
"Where should we go?"
Bóma lichitépó kanthu.
"The Government should do something about it."

When the aspect-marker -ká- 'go and' is added, there are tones on -ka- and the penultimate:

Tikásambíre!
"Let's go and swim!"

The negative, which has the negative-marker -sa- after the subject-marker, has a single tone on the penultimate:

Asabwéré máwa.
"He shouldn't come tomorrow."

The subjunctive can also be used in various subordinate clause constructions, for example to express purpose or a wish or an indirect command:

Ndinámubwereká njingá kutí afiké msánga.
"I lent him the bicycle so that he would arrive quickly."
Ndífuna mubweré máwa.
"I want you to come tomorrow."
Tinawáúzá (kutí) agoné.
"We told them to sleep." (lit. "that they should sleep")

Other clauses where the subjunctive can be used are those where the meaning is "such as", and, as an alternative to an infinitive, after m'maló mótí "instead of":

Sindipézá ntháwi yótí ndichezé náye.
"I won't have time to chat with him." (lit. "such as I may chat")
M'maló mótí akonzé njíngá, waíwononga kweníkwéní.
"Instead of mending the bicycle, he has completely broken it."

It can also be used with the relative clause intonation, after ngati "if" and when the meaning is "if it should be the case that...":

Ngati múkondé nyímbo múmvetseréyi...
"If you like this song you are about to hear..."

Another situation where the subjunctive is used is after ngakhálé 'although':

Ndípita ngakhále mvúla igwé kapená ayí.
"I'll go whether it rains or not."

=== Future subjunctive (-dzá-) ===
If -dzá- is added to the subjunctive it refers to something that should happen or which may happen later. Sometimes it is used in purpose clauses:

Ndinazípónyá m'gálímotomu kutí ndidzáválé pólówa mu Shoprite.
"I popped them (my shoes) in the car so that I could put them on later when I go into Shoprite."
Akufúna kubwérá kuno kutí adzándiwóne.
"She wants to come here so that she can see me.

It can express a wish for the future:

Ámafúna tsíkú liná adzáonétse zithúnzi zomwé wákhálá ákújámbula.
"One day he wants to show the pictures which he has been taking."
Ndichólínga chásúkúluyi kuphúnzítsá omwé ádzathandizé alimi.
"It is the aim of this school to teach those who (it is hoped) in future may help farmers."

It can also be used for an event which might or might not happen in future:

Sanatsimikízébé chótí adzáchíté akadzákula.
"He hasn't yet decided what he might do when he grows up."
N'zósathéka kutí ndidzákhálé ndékha pa valentine.
"It's impossible that I should be alone on Valentine's Day."
Tsíku lidzáfika lomwé iwe ndí ine tídzakumané.
"A day will come when you and I may meet each other."

A further use is in certain kinds of temporal clauses referring to the future, for which see below.

=== Subjunctive with -ká- ===
The aspect-marker -ká- means "go and...". It is often added to the subjunctive to indicate something which is desired to happen or which may happen at another place. It can be used in a purpose clause:

Tináthamangirá pamzere kutí tikápézé mafúta.
"We hurried to join the queue so that we could find some petrol."
Ulendó wángá událi wá ku Chilómóní kutí ndikákumáne ndí msúngwana wína.
"My journey was to Chilomoni so that I could meet a certain girl."

It can also be an indirect command or a wish:

Ndidámúfunsa kutí tikávíné.
"I asked her to dance (that we should go and dance)."
Sautso adálandira uthénga kutí akákumáné náwo.
"Sautso received a message that he should go and meet them."
Akufúna ndikámperekéze ku Shoprite, pali zótí akágúlé.
"She wants me to accompany her to Shoprite; there are things she wants to buy there."

It can refer to something which might happen at another place:

Ndimayámba kugánízira zomwé ndíkapezé ndikafika kumudziko.
"I was beginning to think about the things which I might find when I arrived at the village."

Another use for this tense is in temporal clauses referring to the future, for which see below.

=== -zí- / -dzí- subjunctive (necessitative) ===
An imperfective form of the subjunctive is made by adding the tense-marker -zi-. There are tones on -zí- and on the penultimate. It is referred to by Downing and Mtenje as the "necessitative" tense. The final vowel is -a: ndizíthandíza "I should be helping".

This tense can express an obligation that should be carried out regularly or at all times, or as a "habit or general requirement":

Muzílemekézá makóló anú.
"You must (always) respect your parents."

Just as with the ordinary subjunctive, it can also be used in purpose clauses after kutí "that":

Fóni ndidágula kutí ndizílumikizáná ndí ánzánga.
"I bought the phone so that I could be keeping in touch with my friends."

Another of its uses is to express a "strong obligation equivalent to an order" (Salaun):

Munthuyo azípítá kwáwo.
"That man should go home!"

As with the imperfective future, in some regions -zí- can be replaced with -dzí-.

The negative of this tense is expressed not with -zí- but by adding -má- to the negative subjunctive:

Makóló angá anándíphunzitsá kutí ndisamáchíté nkhanza kwá ámáyi ndipó kutí mkázi ndizímusamála.
"My parents taught me that I should never be cruel to women and that I should always look after my wife."

=== Continuative subjunctive (-ba-) ===
Another kind of subjunctive, much less common than the two described above, is a tense with the aspect-marker -ba- (pronounced -báa-, with a second tone on the penultimate) which means "let's do it while waiting for something else to happen":

Mphunzitsi sanafíke; tibâkasewéra.
"The teacher hasn't come yet; let's go and play meanwhile."
Panopa tíye tibáamwá.
"Right now, come on, let's have a drink meanwhile."
Adáwuza anthuwo kutí abâkonzekéra paméne mafúmu ákúkádziwitsa mfúmu yáíkúlu.
"They told the people that they should carry on making preparations while the chiefs went to inform the senior chief."

It seems possible that -ba- has developed by contraction from the construction yamba "begin" plus the perfect participle described above.

=== -ta- subjunctive ===
A form of the verb with -ta- can be used to express sentences of the kind "Let me do it" or "May I do it", referring to an action which the speaker would like to see done at once. There is a tone on the syllable after -ta-. Unlike the more common participial -ta-, there is no tone on the first syllable:

Nditaóna!
"Let me see!"
Nditakúfunsáni chinthu chimódzi.
"Let me ask you one thing."

These same three prefixes, zi-, ba-, and ta- can also be added to the imperative, with similar meanings (see below).

== Imperative ==
=== Basic Imperative ===
The imperative is the command form of the verb. In Chichewa its basic form consists of the verb stem and final vowel -a. The suffix -ni is added to make it plural or more respectful. The imperative is toneless unless the verb-stem itself has a tone:

Pita katengé gálímotoyo.
"Go and fetch the car!" (familiar, 2nd person singular)
Pitani bwino!
"Go well!" (plural or respectful) (root pita) (more polite, using the plural -ni)
Tsalání bwino!
"Stay well!" (root tsalá)

If the verb-stem is monosyllabic, however, such as -dya "eat", a supporting i- is added before it:

Idyaníko nsíma.
"Please eat some nsíma." (-ko is added for politeness.)

An idiom "very widespread" among Bantu languages, according to Meeussen, is that if a series of commands is given, usually only the first is imperative, the second and third being subjunctive. This usually happens in Chichewa too:

Tulutsani ndaláma, muyiké pansí muzípítá!
"Take out your money, put it on the ground, and be off!"
Bwera uoné.
"Come and see."

=== Imperative with object-marker ===
If an object-marker is added to the basic imperative, the final vowel changes to -e, and the tones are similar to those in the Subjunctive, that is, the tone of the object-marker goes on the syllable which follows, and there is a second tone on the final -e:

Ndithándízéni!
"Help me!"

But in verbs of one or two syllables, there is a single tone on the penultimate:

Ndipátse! (or simply pátse!)
"Give me!"
Ídye!
"Eat it!"

The imperative can be made less direct by adding the suffix -ko, which puts a tone on the syllable before it:

Pátseníko.
"Give me some, please."

=== Imperative with other prefixes ===
The Imperative can also take the aspect-markers ka- "go and" and dza- "come and". In this case although ka- and dza- are toneless, the final vowel becomes -e with a tone:

Kaitané mnzáko.
"Go and call your friend."
Dzaonéni!
"Come and see!"

These two are derived from the imperative of the auxiliary verbs mka "go" and -dza "come" plus the subjunctive; so that dzaoné is derived from idza uoné "come so that you may see".

The prefix -ngo- "just" can also be added, with the supporting vowel i. In this case the final vowel is always -a and there is a tone on the syllable after -ngo-:

Ingobwérani!
"Just come!"

Like the Subjunctive, the Imperative can have the prefixes ta- (derived from the auxiliary verb chita "do" plus the infinitive), ba- "meanwhile", and zi- (imperfective). Ta- is fairly common and is used when the speaker wishes something to be done straightaway or is imploring. It puts a tone on the following syllable:

Tabwéra!
"Please come (now)!"

This imperative with ta- can have an object-prefix added to it (the final vowel remains -a):

Taúzímăni!
"Please put it (the fire) out!"

Ba- (pronounced baa) and zi- put a tone on the penultimate syllable (not counting the plural suffix -ni). These are less commonly used:

Baothérani dzúwa.
"Carry on warming yourselves in the sun (while I fetch the teacher)."
Ziweréngani!
"Keep on reading."

=== Negative Imperative ===
To make a negative command, either the negative subjunctive is used or a form (derived from the negative Infinitive) starting with ósa- (with tones on o- and the penultimate):

Musádye nthochízo.
"Don't eat those bananas."
Ósadyá nthochízo.
"Don't eat those bananas."

Adding the aspect-marker -má- to either of these gives the meaning "don't keep on doing..." or "never do". The final vowel of the negative subjunctive is usually -e:

Usamáchíté zópúsa!
"Don't keep on doing stupid things!"
Ósamánámátú!
"Don't keep telling lies, please!"

== Infinitive ==
The Infinitive is formed with the prefix ku-, which is proclitic, that is, it puts a tone on the syllable following itself: kuthándiza "to help". The negative is made by adding -sa- after -ku-, and has a single tone on the penultimate: kusathandíza "not to help".

=== Ordinary uses of the Infinitive ===
The Infinitive can be used as the subject of a verb, in which case it is translated as a gerund:

Kusúta kúmaonóngá moyo.
"Smoking damages the health."

It can also be the object of verbs such as "want", "be able", "like", "know how to" and so on:

Ndikufúna kupíta.
"I want to go."
Sindíthá kubwéra.
"I can't come."
Ndímadzíwa kuchítá táipi.
"I know how to type."

With the infix -ka- or -dza- the Infinitive can be used to express purpose, following a verb of going or coming respectively:

Ndikupítá kunyumbá kukáchápá zôvála.
"I am going home to wash some clothes."
Ndabwera kudzákúonáni.
"I have come to see you."

But -dza- with the Infinitive can also simply have a future meaning, referring to an event or situation in the distant future:

Síndíkufúna kudzákhálá ndí áná ámbíri.
"I don't want to have a lot of children (lit. to be in future with a lot of children)."

The infinitive also often has the habitual aspect-marker -má-, which adds an additional tone on the penultimate.

Máyiyo adáyamba kumáfíká m'nyumbá.
"That lady began to visit the house regularly."
Sangákwanítse kumándilipirírá fízi.
"She won't be able to keep on paying the fees for me."
Aná sámápita ku sukúlu koma kumáthandízá azibambo áwo.
"The children don't go to school but help their parents."
Ndimabá gálímoto ń'kúmákagulítsa ku Mozambíque.
"I used to steal cars and go and sell them in Mozambique."

-má- can also be added in sentences like the following that describe an event which takes place gradually:

Ngati símúkufúná kudíkira múkhoza kumápítá.
"If you don't want to wait, you can be on your way."
Pamalópo padáyamba kumáfíká anyamatá ósíyanásiyaná.
"In that place various young men gradually began arriving."

Another idiomatic use of the Infinitive is to represent the second of two verbs in the same tense which have the same subject. The Infinitive is preceded by ndí "and" (or after a negative koma "but"). The word ndí is often shortened to ń:

Anthu ámakolóla chímanga ndí kúócha.
"People harvest maize and roast it."
Mbavazi zidáthyola polísi ń'kúményá ápólísi.
"These thieves broke into a police station and beat up the policemen."

There was formerly another idiom of using the prefix na-, ni- or nu- (depending on the class concord) to represent the second of two past or perfect tenses; however, it is not much used in modern Chichewa:

Ánagwá panjingá náthyóká mwendo.
"He fell from his bike and broke his leg."

Sometimes the Infinitive can be used as a tense in its own right, to create a vivid description:

Wájabu kulándíra mpira, kudyétsá njomba, ndí kúpátsira Keegan.
"Wajabu gets the ball, dribbles it, and passes to Keegan."
Akutí achimwené mwaná wá mzungu kuíma apo ndí kúíphulitsá mfuti, ng'anga yáchíkúdayo kumángoséka.
"Brother, they say that the white man stood there and fired his gun, and that witch doctor was just laughing."

The Infinitive can also follow the preposition pa "on", which combines with ku to make po- (with a low tone):

Ndavutiká pobwérá kuno.
"I have had difficulty in getting here."

=== Adjectival Infinitive ===
The Infinitive is frequently combined with á "of" to make a verbal adjective or adverb. The syllables á and ku usually merge to become a high-toned ó, except when the verb is monosyllabic, when they usually remain separate. Thus ákuthándiza "of helping" is shortened to óthándiza, but ákúbá "of stealing" remains unshortened. Since á "of" changes to wá, yá, chá etc. according to the noun it refers to, the verbal adjective changes similarly.

Frequently this form of the Infinitive is used as an adjective or adjectival participle:

Njira yôpítá ku Mwanzá.
"The road going (which goes) to Mwanza."
Ndinu ókwátira?
"Are you married?"
Njingá yókóngola.
"A beautiful bicycle."

It can also be used as a noun, with the noun it agrees with understood:

Zôvála.
"Clothes." (lit. "(things) of wearing")
Ákúbá.
"Thieves." (lit. "(people) of stealing")
Pótúlukira.
"Exit." (lit. "(place) of going out")
Wóyéndetsa gálímoto.
"The driver of the car." (lit. "(the person) of driving the car")

Another use is in combination with the prefix mwá-, contracted to mó-, to make an adverb:

Mófúlumira.
"Rapidly (lit. "in (a manner) of hurrying")
Mósafulumíra.
"Without any haste."

The prefix pó- (with a high tone) can also sometimes be used as an adverb. Pósachédwa usually means "soon" or "after a short time" (literally, "(at a time) of not being delayed"):

Akubwéra pósachédwa.
"He's coming shortly."
Pósachédwa gálímoto idáyamba kuyénda.
"Soon the vehicle began to move."
Mvúla ígwa pósachédwa.
"Rain will fall soon."

Whereas the longer form pósachédwapa usually means "a short time ago". It is often used with the perfect or remote perfect tense:

Pósachédwapa ndaona Kalulú.
"I saw Hare a few moments ago."
Éna angolówa pósachédwapa.
"Some people have just entered a moment ago."
Adásámukatú pósachédwapa; apita ku Thyólo.
"He moved away a while ago; he's gone to Thyolo."

The verb ganiza "think" combined with the zó- form of the Infinitive is a common way of saying "decide to":

Ndináganiza zópíta kupolísi.
"I decided to go to the police."

The negative Infinitive with ósa- has various uses. It can be a command:

Ósalówa.
"Do not enter."

At other times it is an adverb:

Ósazindikíra.
"Without realising."

It can also be a noun:

Ósaóna.
"Blind people."

The word ósatí (from the irregular verb -ti "say") is frequently used to mean "not":

Akázi ósatí amúna.
"Women, not men."

== Participial tenses ==
These tenses occur only in dependent clauses. They generally have relative clause intonation, that is, with a high tone on the subject-marker. In their usage they resemble participles in European languages, but differ from them in that they have a personal subject.

=== -ku- ===
This tense resembles a present participle in meaning: ndíkúthándiza "while (I am/was) helping". It is formed like the Present Continuous, but with a tone on the first syllable as well as the third (the two tones link into a plateau). It can refer to the subject, object, or another noun in the sentence:

Ndíkúyénda ndinaóná munthu ákúkwérá mténgo.
"While I was walking I saw a man climbing a tree."

The verb -li is again an exception, since in this tense it has no -ku-, but merely a tone on the first syllable:

Amadwála kwámbíri áli mwaná.
"He was very sick when he was a child."

A negative of this tense is sometimes found, made with the negative-marker -sa-, which follows the subject-marker:

Ásakuzíndikira.
"Without his realising."

The negative is often replaced by the negative verbal adjective starting with ósa-: ósazindikíra "without realising".

=== -kada- ===
The Persistive Present with -kada- etc. can also be used in a dependent form, especially with the verb -li. In this case there is also a tone on the initial syllable:

Ndidáyamba ndíkadalí ku sukúlu.
"I began when I was still at school."

A frequent use is in the phrase pákádalí pano "at the present time" (lit. "it still being now").

Sákupézéká pákádalí pano.
"He is not available at present."

=== -ta- ===
This tense is formed in the same way, but with -ta- instead of -ku-. The meaning is usually "after doing something":

Átádzúka, anapítá kumsika.
"After getting up, she went to the market."
Anatípézá títáchóka.
"When he arrived we had already left." (lit. "He found us having left.")
Tidzátha ntchítoyi inu mútáchóka.
"We will finish this work after you've left."

Combined with the aspect-marker -ngo-, it can mean "as soon as":

Átángotúlukira mnyamatáyo, anyamatá ónse adákuwa mónyódola.
"As soon as the boy appeared, all the other boys shouted mockingly."

It can also be combined with the verbs -li and khala "be" to make compound tenses:

Ndítábwérá kumudzi ánalí átálémba makálata awíri.
"When I arrived home, (I found that) he had written two letters."
Tsópánó dzúwa linálí lítápéndeka kwámbíri.
"By now the sun had sunk very low."
Ntháwi iméneyo anthu ámakhála átáthá kusósa.
"At this time of year people have generally finished clearing the fields."

The phrase pantháwiyi n'kutí with -ta- means "by this time':

Ntháwiyi n'kutí átádyá kálé.
"By this time he had already eaten."
Pantháwiyi n'kutí anzáke ónse átákwátiwa.
"By this time all her friends had already got married."
Pantháwiyi nkutí mdíma útáténgá maló ndipó á míníbasi ámbíri ádalí átáwéruka.
"By this time darkness had come over the place and most of the minibus drivers had finished work."

Often this tense is used following a verb of wishing, when the thing wished for is unrealisable:

Amalákálaka átákhála ngati mnzáke.
"He wished he could be like his friend."

Another use is in conditional sentences (see below).

It appears from Watkins (1937) that the tense-marker -ta- derives from a compound tense formed with the verb -ti "say" which has fused into a single verb. Thus átákhúta "after his hunger was satisfied" derives from an earlier wátí wákhúta.

=== -sana- ===
The opposite of -ta- is -sana- or -sada-, which means "not yet having done", i.e. "before doing". It can be used of past or future time:

Akufúna kudzálá mbéwu mvúlá ísanabwére.
"He wants to plant the seed before the rain comes."
Dzulo madzuló ndídâkagóna achimwené ásanabwére.
"Last night I had gone to bed before my brother came."

It can be combined with a past tense of -li:

Ádalí ásadakwatíre.
"He had not yet married."
Zidáli zótí n'kale lónse ndídalí ndísanaziónépó
"They were things such as I had never seen before."

In contexts such as the following it means "since":

Papita ntháwi tísanaténgé chikho.
"It's been a while since we won the cup." (lit. "time has gone our not having taken the cup")
Patenga ntháwitú ndísadamuóne.
"It's been a long time indeed since I saw him."

== Temporal clauses ==
As well as the participial verbs above, temporal clauses in Chichewa meaning "when", "since", and "until" can also be made using conjunctions such as paméne, pomwé or m'méne. The tenses used in these clauses are often idiomatic, differing from those used in similar clauses in English. In most cases the verb in the temporal clause takes the relative clause intonation with a tone on the first syllable.

=== "When" ===
The usual conjunction for "when" is paméne, but m'méne and pomwé are also found.

If the main clause describes a situation in the past which was in progress at the time of an event described by a "when" clause, the verb in the "when" clause usually uses an imperfective tense, as in the examples below:

Amavála paméné ndímálówa.
"He was getting dressed when I entered (lit. was entering)."
Ndídalí ndítádyá paméné ánkafíka.
"I had already eaten when he arrived (lit. was arriving)."
Jóni amapámbana mjáhowo paméné ámákómóká.
"John was winning the race when he fainted (lit. was fainting)."
Mméné ámádzídzimuká událi mmawá.
"When he woke up (lit. was waking up) it was morning."

However, when there are two events, one following the other, the perfect tense is used in the "when" clause:

Paméne ánalówa anápézá kutí amáyi aké agoná pansí.
"When he entered, he found his mother was lying on the floor."

The phrase apa ndi pomwé means "this is when" or "it was at this point that...":

Apa ndi pomwé ife tínalowelérápó ndíkúwátsekerá mchitókosi.
"This is when we got involved and locked them up in jail."

Other tenses are possible in temporal clauses; for example, the following, which refer to a future time, use the future subjunctive:

Paméné múdzamuóne mitímá yanú ídzákhutira.
"When you see him, your hearts will be satisfied."
Kulíbe network yá fóni chońcho sitidzátha kuyánkhula ndí ánzáthu pantháwi yónse tídzakhalé kuméneko.
"There's no phone network so we won't be able to talk to our friends all the time that we'll be there."
Muúdzákhala mútádyá paméné ndídzafiké kwánu.
"You will have eaten by the time I get to your house."

The following, also referring to an event in the distant future, use the future continuous subjunctive -zidza-:

Ádzákhala átásósa paméné mvúla ízidzayámba.
"He will have finished clearing the field by the time the rain starts."
Mméné malúmé angáwo ázidzadzíwa, inu mudzákhala mútákházikiká.
"By the time that uncle of yours gets to know, you will be already settled."

The following, describing an event later today, uses the continuous subjunctive -dzika-:

Mméné údzikafíka kunyumbá mnzákoyo ádzákhala átásíyá kupúma.
"By the time you reach home, that friend of yours will have stopped breathing."

=== "Since" ===
A way of expressing "since" is to use a nominalised form of the verb beginning with chi- and ending in -íre or -íreni (in some verbs -ére or -éreni). There is a single tone on the penultimate syllable (not counting -ni):

Chidzukíre sindinasámbe.
"Since getting up I haven't yet had a bath."
Chiyambíreni kugúlitsa mwapindula mótáni?
"Since you began selling, how much profit have you made?"

The subject of the verb can either be put in front of it or added afterwards with chá:

Patenga ntháwi yáítáli dzíkolo chitengére World Cup.
"It's been a long time since that country won the World Cup."
Takhala ndí chísóni chimwalilíre chá ábambo áthu.
"We've been sad ever since our father died."

The same form of the verb with chi...-ire can also mean "still" or "always".

Another way of expressing "since" is to use kuyámbira "to begin from" or kuchókera "to come from", followed by a dependent clause verb:

Zonsézi ndakhala ndíkúzítsátá kuyámbira ndílí mwaná.
"All these things I have been following since I was a child."

Kuyámbira pomwé or kuchókera pomwé can also be used:

Ndakhala ndíkúlíma mundáwo kwá záká 20, kuchókera pomwé makólo angá ádandisíya.
"I've been farming this land for 20 years, since the time when my parents passed away."

For a third way of expressing "since", see -sana- above.

=== "Until" ===
A common way of expressing "until" is to use the word mpaka or mpakana. This can be followed by an infinitive. The meaning is "to the extent that", "so much so that". The subject of the infinitive can be included:

Anákangana ndí bwenzí láké mpakana msúngwánayo kuthétsa ubwenzíwo.
"He and his girlfriend quarrelled so much that eventually the girlfriend ended the relationship."
Adátenga mpeni náunóla pamwalá mpaka kuchíta kutí waliwali.
"He took a knife and sharpened it on a stone until he made it gleam."

In other sentences it is followed by a remote perfect tense with -na- or -da-:

Anádikirábe mpakana ntháwi yówéluka ínakwána.
"They carried on waiting until it was time to go home."

It may also be followed by the -ta- participial tense, when the meaning is "until after":

Gwiritsani ntchíto kóndomu mpakana mútádzíwa zá mómwé múlílí.
"Make use of a condom until you know your HIV status."

When referring to an event in future which might or might not happen, a future subjunctive or potential tense is used:

Máyiyo anánénetsa kutí saperéká ndalámayo kománso satsíká míníbasiyo mpakana akáfíké ku Chírimba.
"The lady insisted that she would not pay any money or get off the minibus until they reached Chilimba."
Óphwányá malamulo áyenerá kusúngidwa ndí ápólísi mpaka ákaweruzídwe kukhóti.
"People who break the law should be held by the police until such time as they are sentenced in a court."

Another common way of expressing "until" is to use the infinitive kufíkira pomwé "to arrive at the point where":

Ukwatiwo udákhala ndíthu kufíkira pomwé mwamúnayo ádagwíra uthénga wódábwitsa.
"The marriage went very well until the time when the husband received a strange message."

== Conditional clauses ==
As well as the participial tenses described above, Chichewa also has a series of tenses meaning "if" or "when", which are used as the equivalent of conditional or temporal clauses.

=== -ka- ===
The tense -ka-, when it is toneless, can be translated "if" or "when". It usually refers to future time:

Ndíyimba fóni ndikafika.
"I'll ring when I get there."
Ndikamúsíyá ádzádwalánso.
"If I leave him, he'll get sick again."
Mukakaná ndíkuwa.
"If you refuse, I shall shout."

There is no negative, but a negative meaning can be expressed with the verb panda "be without":

Ndikapanda kumúitaná sadzabwéra.
"If I don't invite him, he won't come."

=== -kadza- ===
The same tense with -kadza- refers to a time "far in the future":

Ndikadzálemera ndidzágula nyumbá yáíkúlu.
"When I get rich I shall buy a big house."
Tikadzákufunani tidzákúyitanáni.
"If we need you at some future date, we'll call you."

=== -kama- ===
This tense means "if ever" or "whenever". Unlike -ka- it refers to past or present time according to context. The tones are on -ma- and the penultimate syllable:

Ukamándilankhúla úmandisangalátsa.
"Whenever you talk to me, you make me happy."
Ntháwi zónse akamákwérá bási, iyé ankásánkhá yomwé íli ndí chóyímbira chábwino.
"Whenever he used to get on a bus, he would always choose one with a good music system."

Sometimes, however, -ka- is used in the place of -kama- to refer to a habitual situation:

Akalandira ndaláma amagúlira msúngwana mphátso.
"Whenever he received money, he used to buy the girl a present."

=== -kamadza- ===
To refer to a situation in the future, the aspect-marker -dza- can be added:

Adámúuza kutí akamádzadútsa pa Chitákálé adzáyímé pa nyumbá yáké.
"She told him that if ever he were passing through Chitakale in future he should stop by at her house."

=== -ta- ===
As well as meaning "after", the participial tense -ta- can also have the meaning "if", referring to a hypothetical situation in the future. The main clause will often use -nga- or khoza "be able":

Pátádútsá munthu, ungathe kumángá buléki?
"If someone stepped in front of the car, could you brake in time?"
Mútáséma mútávála chíngachitíke n'chiyáni?
"If you were to cut (this root) with your clothes on, what would happen?"
Ngakhále mútákáná bwánji palíbé ákukhulupiriréni.
"Even if you were to deny it, there's no one who would believe you."
Chingakhale bwino kutí inu mútáfíka kuno mwámsánga.
"It would be good if you could get here quickly."

Another possibility is to use ndítátí (lit. "if I were to say") with the subjunctive:

Mútátí mumuóne mkáziyo, múkhoza kudábwa.
"If you were to see that lady, you might be surprised."

=== -kada- / -kana- ===
To make a condition about a hypothetical situation in the past, -kada- or -kana- or -daka- is used in both halves of the sentence, with the relative clause intonation in the "if" clause. The main clause has a tone on the second syllable of the infix:

Ákadadzíwa sákadáchita.
"If he had known, he wouldn't have done it."
Ndíkadamuitána akadábwera.
"If I had called him, he would have come."
Múkadapítá ku chipatala, mukadáchira msánga.
"If you had gone to hospital, you would have got better quickly."

A compound expression is also found, using Ndíkadakhála kutí in place of "if":

Ń'kadakhála kutí ndikadalí pantchíto, síbwenzi ndílí pano.
"If I were still at work, I wouldn't be here."

An "if" clause alone can also mean "should have" or "if only":

Múkadandiúzá msánga.
"You should have told me at once." (lit. "if only you had told me...")
Ákadamvérá mawú á agógo.
"If only he'd listened to his grandparents' advice!"

The same tense can be used when wishing for some past hypothetical situation:

Akulákalaka ákanabadwírá kwína.
"He wishes he'd been born somewhere else."

For a negative condition, the verb -panda ("be without") is used in the "if" clause:

Ndíkadapánda kumúitaná, sákadábwera.
"If I hadn't called him, he wouldn't have come."

Sometimes, instead of using -kada- in the main clause, the word bwenzi "it would be the case that" or síbwenzi "it would not be the case that" is used, followed by a participial verb:

Múkadapítá kuchipatala, bwenzi mútáchíra msánga.
"If you had gone to hospital, you would have got better quickly."

The following example, instead of -kada-, uses the present participial tense of -li in the "if" clause:

Múlí inu, mukanátání?
"If it were you, what would you have done?"

Sentences with -kada- usually refer to the past. However, sometimes if -khala is used, the reference can be to a hypothetical situation in the present:

Pákadapándá ine, iwe ukadákhala kuti?
"If it were not for me, where would you be?"

The main clause in a hypothetical conditional can also be expressed using the word bwenzi "it would be the case that" followed by a participial tense:

Ádakakhálá nyénga, bwenzi tíkúóna bweyá wáké wósósoká.
"If it were a mongoose (stealing the chickens), we would be seeing its torn off fur."

Ákadakhála kutí azamba akugwírábé ntchíto yawó bwenzi ndítápíta kuméneko.
"If the midwives were still working, I would have gone there."

The negative is sí bwenzi:

Ndídakakhálá ine sí bwenzi ndítávómereza zikálata.
"If it had been me, I wouldn't have accepted the documents."

=== -chi- ===
In some varieties of Chichewa the tense-marker -chi- can be used in the "if" clause in hypothetical conditional sentences referring to present time instead of -kada-:

Uchíngofótokoza
"If only you would explain!"

Kadúkako lichikhala litsiro / Línalí lósámvá sópo.
"If that jealousy were dirt, it would be dirt which doesn't feel soap."

The form achikhala (kutí) or chikhala kutí can mean "if" in a hypothetical conditional:

Ndikadákúonetsani achikhala ndinalí náwo.
"I would show you if I had any."

The words bwenzi and síbwenzi followed by a participial tense can be used in the main clause instead of -kada-:

Chikhala kutí ápólísi sádagwíre mbavazi, bwezi zítádzétsa mavúto ámbíri.
"If the police hadn't caught these thieves, it would have brought many problems."

Pachipanda asíng'anga sí bwenzi mnyamatáyu álí ndí moyo.
"Were it not for the traditional doctor, this boy would not be alive."

The use of -chi- in a counterfactual conditional is found in Johannes Rebmann's Dictionary of the Kiniassa Language (entry "Pfomera"), written in the 1850s, in the sentence: ine nikidsiwa, sikapfomerera (modern spelling: ine ndichidziwa, si(ndi)ka(da)vomerera), which he translates: "If I had known it, I should not have assented".

=== ngati ("if") ===
Another way of making a condition is to use the conjunction ngati "if", followed by the relative clause intonation. This is in fact the only way conditions can be expressed with the verb -li.

Asapíté kumsonkhano ngati sáli bwino.
"He should not go to the meeting if he's not well."

Ngati can also be used to make indirect questions:

Síndídziwa ngati álípó.
"I don't know if he's there."

Ngati can also be followed by a subjunctive with relative clause intonation:

Ngati múkondé nyímbo múmvetseréyi, sindikizani "star" kutí mugulé.
"If you like this music you are hearing, press * to buy it."

Ngati can be combined with -kada-:

Adádziŵa kutí ngati chílíchonsé chíkadachitíka mu mpándamo, zikadádzámúvuta.
"He knew that if anything had happened inside his compound, it would have caused him problems later."

Ngati can also mean "as if", but in this case it is not followed by the relative clause intonation:

Adámvá nkhúku íkúlíra ngati yaona chinthu chówópsa.
"He heard a hen shrieking as if it had seen something frightening."

== Wishes ==
The conditional clause tenses -ta- and -kada- are used after a verb of wishing, if the wish is unfulfilled. -ta- is used for wishes for the future:

Álíyensé ámafunitsítsa átámádya nsómba zókwánira kutí akhalé ndí thupi láthanzi.
"Everyone would very much like to be eating enough fish to have a healthy body."
Amafúnitsitsá átábéreka.
"He wished he could have a child."
Análakalaka nthaka ítámúmézá.
"He wished the ground would swallow him up."

Wishes for the future are not always unfulfillable:

Ámafúna átádzákhálá mlimi ngati bambo áke.
"He would like one day to be a farmer like his father."

The tense -kada- or -daka- is used of unfulfilled wishes for the past. Just as in conditional clauses, the auxiliary verb -panda is used to make the clause negative:

Úlákalaka údakapánda kubádwa.
"You will wish you had never been born."
Ndidálakalaka ndídakanyamúka mmawá wá tsíkulo potí síndikadáfika ku táwuniko ndí mdíma.
"I wished I had set off in the morning of that day because then I wouldn't have arrived in town after dark."
Adáfunitsitsá ntháwiyi ákadakhála ndí mphámvu.
"He wished at this moment he had had the strength."

== Indirect statements ==
In English, as in some other languages, a verb in an indirect statement usually goes into the past tense when the main verb is in the past tense. However, in Chichewa this rule does not apply and sentences such as the following, in which there is no change of tense in the dependent clause, are common:

Anáganiza kutí íyé waledzera.
"They thought that he was drunk (lit. he has become drunk)."
Anándíuza kutí sáli bwino.
"He told me that he wasn't well (lit. isn't well)."

In the same way, the participial tenses can refer to a present, past, or future situation according to the tense of the main verb which they are used:

- Ndináwápeza (ndináápézá) ákúpémphera.
  "I found them (while they were) praying."
- Ndingawápeze (ndingaápézé) átádyá.
  "l might find them having already eaten."

== "To be" ==
There are several verbs used for expressing different tenses of the verb "to be".

=== ndi and sí ===
One word for expressing "is" or "are" is ndi (negative sí), used in the present tense only. This word is used for permanent states or identity:

Madzí ndi ófúniká.
"Water is important."
Búku liméné lílí pathébulo ndi lánga.
"The book which is on the table is mine."
Kuyéndá usíku sí bwino.
"Walking at night isn't good."

The toneless ndi "is" is to be distinguished from ndí "with", "and", which has a tone. Sometimes ndi is shortened to n':

Chíngachitíke n'chiyáni?
"What would happen?" (lit. "the thing that would happen is what?")

Ndi can also be combined with w- to make ngw-, and y- to make nj-. The n in these combinations is homorganic, but (unlike in words such as njóka 'snake') syllabic:

Munthuyu ngwábódza (= ndi wábódza)
"This man is a liar."
Nthéndayi njópátsirana (= ndi yópátsirana).
"This illness is infectious."

The w part of a labialised consonant disappears before o and u:

Munthuyu ngóípa (= ndi wóípa).
"This man is bad."

Ndi can have pronominal endings attached to it, e.g. ndine "I am", ndiwe "you are". The first and second persons are toneless; all the other endings have a tone, e.g. ndiwó "they are":

Ine ndine mphunzitsi.
"I am a teacher."
Síndine mphunzitsi.
"I am not a teacher."
Ichi ndichó chímavúta.
"This is what causes problems."

=== -li ===
The verb -li is irregular and has very few tenses. In the present tense is used mainly for temporary states and for location, but other tenses have a more general usage, since ndi has no past tense.

In the present simple tense it is irregular, since there is no tone on the subject prefix:

Ali bwino.
"He's fine."
Alí kuti?
"Where is he?"

The Recent Past refers to situations of today:

Unalí kuti?
"Where were you? / Where have you been?"

The Remote Past is ndínaalí or ndídaalí. This refers to a time further in the past. It can refer to a situation which later changed:

adábwera ndí kálata yá thalansiféala yóchókera ku sukúlu yá Nsipú komwé ádaalí.
"She came with a letter of transfer from Nsipu school where she had been previously."

It is also often used in story-telling:

Lídaalí tsíku Lówéruka ntháwi yá 9 koloko mmawá.
"It was a Saturday at 9 o'clock in the morning."

Often the pronunciation ndináli is heard, apparently with the same meaning as ndí-naa-lí:

Mphunzitsi wánu análi ndaní?
"Who was your teacher?"

The Persistive has a tone on the final syllable: ndikadalí (ndikalí) "I am still".

Achimwené ánú akadalí moyo.
"Your brother is still alive."

Negative forms also exist except for the Persistive tense: síndili "I am not", síndínalí "I was not".

Sáli ku Lilongwe.
"They are (he is) not in Lilongwe."
Síndínalí ku msonkhano.
"I wasn't at the meeting."

==== "I have" ====
The phrase ndili ndí (lit. "I am with") means "I have".

Ndili ndí áná awíri.
"I have two children."
Tidáli ndí msonkhano wá alimi ónse.
"We had a meeting of all the farmers."

The negative is ndilíbe "I do not have".

Ndilíbé aná.
"I don't have any children."

==== Locative forms ====
The forms kuli, pali, muli mean "there is" or "there are". ku- refers to a general area or place, pa- to a particular spot, mu- to inside a place:

Kodí kuno kuli mipíngo?
"Are there churches here?"
Pali zifukwá zingápo.
"There are several reasons."
Muno muli anthu angáti?
"How many people are there in here?"

The negative is kulíbe, palíbe, mulíbe "there isn't":

Kunyumbá adápézá mkází waké kulíbe.
"He discovered that his wife wasn't at home."
Palíbe ádayánkha
"There is no one who answered" i.e. "No one answered."
Mulíbé ndaláma m'gálímoto.
"There is no money in the car."

These can also be used in the past tense:

Kalekálero kunálíbé sukúlu.
"In the old days there was no school here."

. There are also locative forms ending in -líko, -lípo, -límo. Of these, -lípo is the most common:

Kodí bambo alípo? – Ĭnde, alípo. / Ayí, palíbe.
"Is your father here?" – "Yes, he is." / "No, he isn't here."

==== In a relative clause ====
When -li is used in a relative clause, it has a tone on the prefix:

Imani pomwé múli ndipó musayénde!
"Stay where you are and don't move!"
Móto úmapíta kúli ntchíre.
"Fire goes where there is bush." (Proverb)

There is also an applied form ending in -lili used in phrases of manner, which also has the relative clause intonation:

Mméne zinthu zílílí m'dzíkó muno.
"The way things are in this country."
Ndingadzásangalale ngati átádzákhálá msilikáli móngá momwé ánalíli abambo ánga.
"I would be delighted if one day he were to become a soldier like my father was."

==== Participial tenses ====
With the relative clause intonation -li often serves as a participial tense. Thus ndíli means "while I am" or "while I was":

Ukwati unáchitiká ndílí kusukúlu.
"The wedding took place while I was at school."

A negative participial form ndisalí exists, although it is rarely used:

Akáziwa amafúna kutí udzáwápéze asalí ndí páthupi.
"These wives wanted you to find them not being pregnant."

The participial form is also found in the common phrase álíyensé "every", literally "it being everyone". It can be singular or plural:

Álíyensé análi wókóndwa kwámbíri.
"Everyone was very pleased."
Ímachitíka kamódzi pa zaká zináyi zílízonsé.
"It takes place once every four years."

A persistive participial form ndíkádalí (or ndíkalí) also exists meaning "while I am still" or "while I was still":

Ndidáyamba ndíkadalí ku sukúlu.
"I began when I was still at school."
Pákádalí pano (or pákalí pano)
"At the moment" (lit. "it still being now")

=== -khala ===
For the infinitive, imperative, subjunctive, and all other tenses of "to be", the verb -khala ("sit" or "stay") is used:

Imperative:

Khalani chete.
"Be quiet!"

Infinitive:

Ákhoza kukhála ndaní?
"Who could it be?"

Present Subjunctive:

Wína álíyensé azídya nsómba kutí akhalé wáthanzi.
"Everyone should eat fish regularly so that he can be healthy."

Present Habitual:

Nsómba yóónongeká ímakhála ndí majéremusi ámbíri.
"A rotten fish usually has a lot of germs."

Near Future:

Máwa úkhala bwino.
"You'll be OK tomorrow."

Remote Future:

Tidzákhala ndí áná.
"We will have children one day."

Perfect:

Ndakhala pabánja kwá záká zisanu.
"I've been married for five years."

Counterfactual conditional:

Múkadakhála inu mukadáchita bwánji?
"If it had been you, what would you have done?"

Past Potential:

Kodí pákadapándá ine, iwe ukadákhala kuti?
"If it were not for me, where would you be?"

When -khala is used with the infix -dá-, it can mean "happen" or "become":

Zidákhala bwánji kutí mubweré ku Maláwi?
"How did it happen that you came to Malawi?"

== Compound tenses ==
Compound tenses are also found in Chichewa. Among them are the following:

=== Compound tenses with -li ===
-li can be followed by an infinitive:

Ndili kumvá bwino.
"I'm feeling fine."
Síndínalí kudzíwa.
"I didn't know."

But a participial tense is also sometimes used:

Mvúla ídalí íkúgwábé.
"The rain was still falling."

A past tense of -li with the -ta- participial tense is common:

Análi átádyá.
"He had already eaten."
Ádalí átátúluka kuméne kundendé.
"He had just come out of prison."

With a verb like vala "dress in", where the perfect tense describes a present situation, this tense describes a past situation:

Ónse adáli átáválá zófíira ndipó adáli kuímba.
"They were all dressed in red and were singing."
Análi átányámula báwo.
"He was carrying a bawo board."
Máyiyo adáli átábéreka mwaná kumbúyo
"The lady was carrying a child on her back."

The participial verb can be -sana- or -sada-, with the meaning "had not" or "had not yet":

Ádalí ásadalipíre rénti kwá ení nyumbá kwá miyezí isanu.
"He hadn't paid rent to the owners of the house for five months."
Adáli ásadakwatíre.
"He had not yet married."
Ádalí ásadawónépó mkázi wókóngola chomwécho.
"He had never seen such a beautiful woman."

=== Compound tenses with -khala ===
-khala is generally combined with one of the participial tenses. It can translate the perfect or pluperfect continuous:

Ndakhala ndíkúkúdikiríra kwá záká zitátu.
"I have been waiting for you for three years."
Ádakhála ákúsúngira ndaláma kwá ntháwi yáítáli.
"He had been saving up money for a long time."

It can also translate the future perfect tense:

Tíkhala títádyá maúngu.
"We will have eaten the pumpkins."
Mudzákhala mútádyá.
"You will have eaten."

The Present Habitual tense of khala with a participial tense can often be translated with the word "usually" or "generally":

Akamápítá ku sukúluko ámakhála átányámula majúmbo á zákúdyá zósíyanásiyaná.
"Whenever she goes to school she is usually carrying bags of food of different kinds."
Ntháwi ikakwana 4 koloko anthuwa ámakhála átásónkhana kale m'maló ómwérá mowa.
"By the time it's 4 o'clock these people have usually already gathered at bottle stores."
Pantháwiyi óphúnziráwa ámakhála ásanalémbé mayeso.
"At this time these students have usually not yet written their exams."

=== Compound tenses with -ti ===
The verb -ti "say", followed by one of the subjunctive tenses, makes a future in the past:

Timatí tikádye maúngu.
"We were going to eat pumpkins."
Mméné ámátí adzíkwérá bási kondákitala adámuuza kutí sángakwére ndí nkhúku.
"When he was about to get on the bus, the conductor told him that he couldn't get on with a chicken."

The literal meaning of timatí tikádye is "we were saying we should go and eat". Other ways of expressing the future in the past are to add -dza- to the Past Imperfective tense (ndimadzáthandizá "I was about to help") or to use -funa "want" with the Infinitive (ndinkáfuná kuthándiza "I was wanting to help").

=== Compound tenses with -chita ===
The verb -chita "do" can be used in various tenses followed by an Infinitive, e.g.:

Ankáchitá kunénétsá.
"He used to say insistently."
Zikusónyeza kutí iyé adáchita kuphédwa.
"The indications are that she was murdered."
Mbátata síichita kufúná zámbíri pa ulimi wáke.
"Sweet potatoes don't require many things for their cultivation."

The difference in meaning, if any, between this and the simple form of the verb is not clear.

The verb -chita (or sometimes -panga) is also frequently used in colloquial Chichewa in various tenses to make English borrowed words into Chichewa verbs:

Análi átángochítá ritáyala pantchíto.
"He had just recently retired from work."

A further auxiliary verb, yenda "walk, go", is mentioned by Watkins in the form Present Simple plus Infinitive; it was used in narrative with the meaning "and then" (ayéndopíta "he then went"). However, this verb is no longer used as an auxiliary in current standard Chichewa.

== See also ==
- Chichewa tones

== Bibliography ==
- Batteen, Christopher (2012). "The structure of the do/make construction in Chichewa and Chichewa/English". Studies in the Linguistic Sciences: Illinois Working Papers 2012: 1–16.
- Chibambo, Mackenzie I. (2008) [2006]. Nkhokwe ya Malamulo a Chichewa. 2nd edition. CLAIM, Malawi.
- Comrie, Bernard (1978) [1976]. Aspect. Cambridge University Press.
- Downing, Laura J.; Al D. Mtenje (2017). The Phonology of Chichewa. Oxford University Press.
- Funnell, Barry J. (2004)."A Contrastive Analysis of Two Varieties of Sena". MA dissertation, University of South Africa. (Introduction)
- Gray, Andrew; Lubasi, Brighton; Bwalya, Phallen (2013). Town Nyanja: a learner's guide to Zambia's emerging national language.
- Hyman, Larry M. & Al D. Mtenje (1999a). "Prosodic Morphology and tone: the case of Chichewa" in René Kager, Harry van der Hulst and Wim Zonneveld (eds.) The Prosody-Morphology Interface. Cambridge University Press, 90–133.
- Hyman, Larry M. & Al D. Mtenje (1999b). "Non-Etymological High Tones in the Chichewa Verb", Malilime: The Malawian Journal of Linguistics no.1.
- Kamwendo, Gregory H. (1999). "Work in Progress: The Monolingual Dictionary Project in Malawi", Malilime: The Malawian Journal of Linguistics no.1.
- Kanerva, Jonni M. (1990). Focus and Phrasing in Chichewa Phonology. New York, Garland.
- Katsonga-Woodward, H. (2012). Chichewa 101. Zumex Press.
- Kishindo, Pascal, (2001). "Authority in Language: The Role of the Chichewa Board (1972–1995) in Prescription and Standardization of Chichewa" Archived 2016-03-03 at the Wayback Machine. Journal of Asian and African Studies, No. 62.
- Kiso, Andrea (2012). Tense and Aspect in Chichewa, Citumbuka, and Cisena. Stockholm University Ph.D. thesis.
- Kulemeka, Andrew T. (2002). Tsinde: Maziko a Galamala ya Chichewa, Mother Tongue editions, West Newbury, Massachusetts.
- Mapanje, J.A.C. (1983) On the Interpretation of Aspect and Tense in Chiyao, Chicheŵa, and English. University College London Ph.D. thesis.
- Louw, Johan K. (1987). Pang'onopang'ono ndi Mtolo: Chichewa: A Practical Course. UNISA Press.
- Maxson, Nathaniel (2011). Chicheŵa for English Speakers: A New and Simplified Approach. Assemblies of God Literature Press, Malawi.
- Mchombo, Sam (2004). Syntax of Chichewa. Cambridge University Press.
- Meeussen, A. E. "Bantu Grammatical Reconstructions". Africana Linguistica 3, 1967. pp. 79–121. ( Alternative link.)
- Moto, Francis (1983). "Aspects of Tone Assignment in Chichewa", Journal of Contemporary African Studies, 3:1.
- Mtenje, Al D. (1986). Issues in the Non-Linear Phonology of Chichewa part 1. Issues in the Non-Linear Phonology of Chichewa part 2. PhD Thesis, University College, London.
- Mtenje, Al D. (1987). "Tone Shift Principles in the Chichewa Verb: A Case for a Tone Lexicon", Lingua 72, 169–207.
- Mtenje, Al D. (1995). "Tone Shift, Accent and the Domains in Bantu: the Case of Chichewa", in Katamba, Francis. Bantu Phonology and Morphology: LINCOM Studies in African Linguistics 06.
- Ngoma, Sylvester J.L.; Amos, M. Chauma (2011). Tizame M'Chichewa: Malamulo Ophunzitsira ndi Kuphunzitsira Chichewa. Bookland International, Blantyre.
- Paas, Steven (ed.) (2016). Oxford Chichewa-English English-Chichewa Dictionary. Oxford University Press.
- Plungian, Vladimir A. & Johan van der Auwera (2006). "Towards a typology of discontinuous past marking." Sprachtypol. Univ. Forsch. (STUF), Berlin 59, 4, 317–349.
- Salaun, Rev. Fr. Noel (1993) [1969]. Chicheŵa Intensive Course, 3rd edition. Likuni Press and Publishing House, Malawi.
- Scott, David Clement & Alexander Hetherwick (1929). Dictionary of the Nyanja Language.
- Scotton, Carol Myers & Gregory John Orr, (1980). Learning Chichewa, Bk 1. Learning Chichewa, Bk 2. Peace Corps Language Handbook Series. Peace Corps, Washington, D.C.
- Stevick, Earl et al. (1965). Chinyanja Basic Course. Foreign Service Institute, Washington, D.C.
- Watkins, Mark Hanna (1937). A Grammar of Chichewa: A Bantu Language of British Central Africa, Language, Vol. 13, No. 2, Language Dissertation No. 24 (Apr.-Jun., 1937), pp. 5–158.
