= Discontinuous past =

Category of grammatical past tense

Discontinuous past is a category of past tense of verbs argued to exist in some languages which have a meaning roughly characterizable as "past and not present" or "past with no present relevance". The phrase "discontinuous past" was first used in the sense described here in an article by the linguists Vladimir Plungian and Johan van der Auwera published in 2006.

Plungian and van der Auwera distinguish two types of discontinuous past: imperfective and perfective. An imperfective discontinuous past is a tense like "he used to come" in English, which usually carries an implication that the activity was of limited duration.

A perfective discontinuous past is a past tense where the result of the action, not the action itself, was of limited duration and no longer holds at the moment of speech. Thus in a language containing such a tense, the equivalent of "he came" would usually imply that the person has gone away again. Such tenses have also been labelled "anti-resultative" or tenses of "cancelled (or reversed) result".

Similarly, a pluperfect tense such as "he had come" could either be a perfect in the past (implying that the man was still there), or a discontinuous past in the past (implying that the man had come earlier on but had now gone away again). In English the tense can have both meanings.

== Typology of discontinuous past markers ==
Plungian and van der Auwera distinguish three possibilities of marking the discontinuous past in various languages:

- The discontinuous past marker may be the only marker of tense within a basically non-tensed verbal system. Such systems are found in the Pacific Ocean languages, east and west Africa, and in languages of North America and the Amazon. “Atemporal” systems with discontinuous past marking are also typical for many Creole languages.
- The discontinuous past marker may be one among several tense markers in a system, which thus provides a fine-grained grammatical distinction between the standard past and the discontinuous past.
- A system may have no specialized discontinuous past markers, but the meaning of the discontinuous past can be part of the meaning of another verbal marker. In this case one can also speak about a “discontinuous use” of some marker (with other basic meanings or uses).

In terms of morphology, a common source of discontinuous past tenses can be tenses which denote the remote past. In many languages discontinuous past tenses are also derived from the pluperfect tense.

In a questionnaire devised by Östen Dahl (1985) to elicit tenses used in various languages in different contexts, one question in particular was designed with regard to a non-continuous past situation:

- Q61 [It is cold in the room. The window is closed. Question:] You <open> the window (and closed it again)?

According to Dahl, "quite a few" languages use the pluperfect tense in answering this question. Other languages, such as Oneida (spoken in North America) and Akan (spoken in Ghana) have specialised markers for this situation.

== Types of discontinuous past ==
Plungian and van der Auwera divide discontinuous past tenses into imperfective and perfective. With imperfective verbs (states, durative processes, habitual situations), the markers of discontinuous past "denote situations of limited duration, which are claimed not to extend up to the moment of speech".

Imperfective tenses can be divided into various categories, for example stative, progressive, iterative, and habitual. According to Plungian and van der Auwera, discontinuous past marking is found most often for habituals.

== English ==
An example of past imperfect tense in English which is often said to have a discontinuous meaning is the English past tense with "used to":

- I used to live in London.

This tense normally carries an implication that the speaker no longer lives in London, although, as Comrie points out, this implication is not absolute. For example, the following sentence probably implies that the person still smokes:

- He already used to smoke even when he was at school.

The other English past imperfective tense ("I was doing") does not have a discontinuous implication and can be used in either situation:

- He was sitting at his desk a moment ago (but isn't there now).
- He was sitting at his desk a moment ago (and probably still is).

== Kisi ==
The Kisi or Kissi language spoken in Guinea in West Africa like English has both past progressive and past habitual forms. The past progressive "differs from the Past Habitual in that it says nothing about the present state of affairs. The Past Habitual conveys that the state no longer obtains or the action is no longer occurring. The Past Progressive ... says that an action was once ongoing (and may still be ongoing)".

== Chichewa ==
Chichewa is a Bantu language spoken in Malawi in central Africa. It has four tenses available to express events in the past. Two of them, like the English perfect, imply that the result of the action still prevails:

- Perfect: wabwera "he has come (today), and is still here"
- Remote perfect: adábwera "he came (yesterday or earlier), and is still here"

The two past tenses, however, normally imply that the result of the action no longer holds:

- Past: anabwéra "he came (today), but has now gone"
- Remote past: ádáabwéra "he came (yesterday or earlier), but has now gone"

In his Grammar of Chichewa (1937) Mark Hanna Watkins refers to these four tenses as "Recent past with present influence", "Remote past with present influence", "Recent past without present influence" and "Remote past without present influence" respectively. Of the Remote past without present influence (tense-marker -daa-) and the Remote past with present influence (tense-marker -da-) he writes:

"If one wishes to adhere to good theology, one must say:

- Yesu Khirisitu adaafa

"Jesus Christ died, but did not remain dead"

"not:

- Yesu Khirisitu adafa

"Jesus Christ died and is dead".

"But one must use the latter form in order to agree with Genesis:

- Chiwuta adapanga dziko

"God created the world and his creation is yet existent"

"not:

- Chiwuta adaapanga dziko.

"The last statement would ... be quite perplexing unless the native should decide that a second creator did a more enduring piece of work."

The two hodiernal perfective tenses of Chichewa are parallel to the remote ones. Watkins refers to these as the Recent past with present influence (tense-marker -a-) and the Recent past without present influence (tense-marker -na-). He gives the following examples:

- ndadya

"I have eaten (and am not now hungry)"

- ndinadya

"I ate (but am now hungry again)"

== Swiss French ==
Some dialects of French, notably Swiss French, have a tense known as the passé surcomposé or "doubly compound past", made using the perfect tense of the auxiliary combined with the perfect participle, e.g. il a eu mangé (literally, "he has had eaten"). In some contexts this tense can have a discontinuous implication:

- J'ai eu su, mais j'ai oublié.

"I used to know, but I have forgotten."

- Elle a eu mangé, mais elle ne mange plus.

"(The baby) used to eat (solid food), but she doesn't eat it any more."

According to de Saussure and Sthioul (2012), such sentences are often used in contexts where there is not only an implication that the state no longer holds but where there is also a potentiality that the situation might be reversed.

In other contexts the double perfect is not discontinuous but is used like a pluperfect to emphasise that the activity was brought to a conclusion:

- Quand il a eu mangé, il est parti.

"When he had finished eating, he departed."

== Latin ==
The Latin language has two forms of the pluperfect tense in passive and deponent verbs, one using the imperfect tense erat as an auxiliary, the other using the pluperfect tense fuerat. The latter usually has a discontinuous meaning, as in the following examples, which contain both types of pluperfect:

- pōns, quī fuerat tempestāte interruptus, paene erat refectus (Caesar)

"The bridge, which had been broken by a storm, had almost been rebuilt."

- tumultus ... quī prīncipiō eius annī exortus fuerat, ... brevī oppressus erat (Livy)

"A rebellion ..., which had arisen at the beginning of that year, had soon been put down."

The fact that the first event described in each sentence is earlier than the second "is clearly a factor in the choice of tense". But there is also an element of discontinuous past, since the result of the first verb was later cancelled by the second.

The perfect infinitive passive made using the perfect infinitive fuisse can also have a discontinuous meaning:

populum Tanaquil adloquitur ... sōpītum fuisse rēgem subitō ictū; ... iam ad sē redīsse (Livy)
'Tanaquil addressed the people: she said that the king had been knocked unconscious by the sudden blow, but he had now recovered'

== See also ==
- Chichewa tenses
- Latin tenses#Perfect passive tenses made with fuī and fueram

== Bibliography ==
- Cable, Seth (2015): "The Tlingit Decessive and 'Discontinuous Past' ". Ms. University of Massachusetts.
- Comrie, Bernard (1976). Aspect. Cambridge University Press.
- Dahl, Östen (1985): Tense and aspect systems. Oxford: Blackwell
- de Saussure, Louis; Sthioul, B. (2012). "The Surcomposé Past Tense". In Binnick, R. I. (ed.) The Oxford Handbook of Tense and Aspect, ch. 20.
- Kiso, Andrea (2012). "Tense and Aspect in Chichewa, Citumbuka, and Cisena". Ph.D. Thesis. Stockholm University, p.119-121.
- Plungian, Vladimir A. & Johan van der Auwera (2006). "Towards a typology of discontinuous past marking." Sprachtypol. Univ. Forsch. (STUF), Berlin 59, 4, 317–349.
- Squartini, Mario (1999): "On the semantics of the Pluperfect: evidence from Germanic and Romance", in: Linguistic Typology 3.1, 51–89.
- Watkins, Mark Hanna (1937). A Grammar of Chichewa: A Bantu Language of British Central Africa, Language, Vol. 13, No. 2, Language Dissertation No. 24 (Apr.-Jun., 1937), pp. 5–158.
