= Avalency =

Property of a predicate taking no arguments

In linguistics and grammar, avalency refers to the property of a predicate, often a verb, taking no arguments. Valency refers to how many and what kinds of arguments a predicate licenses—i.e. what arguments the predicate selects grammatically. Avalent verbs are verbs which have no valency, meaning that they have no logical arguments, such as subject or object. Languages known as pro-drop or null-subject languages do not require clauses to have an overt subject when the subject is easily inferred, meaning that a verb can appear alone. However, non-null-subject languages such as English require a pronounced subject in order for a sentence to be grammatical. This means that the avalency of a verb is not readily apparent, because, despite the fact that avalent verbs lack arguments, the verb nevertheless has a subject. According to some, avalent verbs may have an inserted subject (often a pronoun such as it or there), which is syntactically required, yet semantically meaningless, making no reference to anything that exists in the real world. An inserted subject is referred to as a pleonastic, or expletive it (also called a dummy pronoun). Because it is semantically meaningless, pleonastic it is not considered a true argument, meaning that a verb with this it as the subject is truly avalent. However, others believe that it represents a quasi-argument, having no real-world referent, but retaining certain syntactic abilities. Still others consider it to be a true argument, meaning that it is referential, and not merely a syntactic placeholder. There is no general consensus on how it should be analyzed under such circumstances, but determining the status of it as a non-argument, a quasi-argument, or a true argument, will help linguists to understand what verbs, if any, are truly avalent. A common example of such verbs in many languages is the set of verbs describing weather. In providing examples for the avalent verbs below, this article must assume the analysis of pleonastic it, but will delve into the other two analyses following the examples.

== Examples of avalent verbs ==
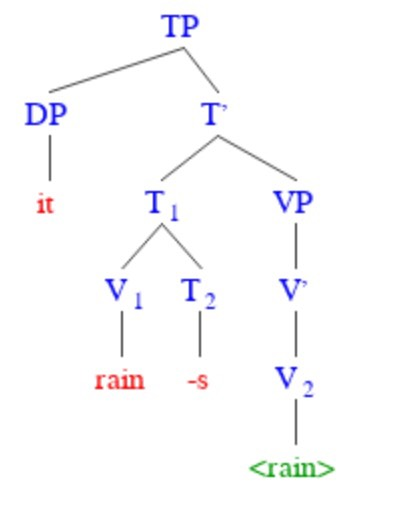
Figure 1. Syntax phrase structure tree. This English sentence reads, "It rains." N.B. The angled brackets around "rain" indicate syntactic movement. The tree was creating using phpSyntaxTree.

=== Avalent verbs in non-null-subject languages ===
In non-null-subject languages (also referred to as languages which are not pro-drop languages) avalent verbs typically still have a subject. The subject, however, is not truly an actant (or, agent), but rather simply a marker of third person singular. The following examples have been taken from Lucien Tesnière's Elements of Structural Syntax.

- Examples in English:
1. It rains. (See Figure 1.)
2. It is snowing.
- Examples in French:
1. Il pleut. Meaning, "It rains," or "It is raining."
2. Il neige. Meaning, "It snows," or "It is snowing."
- Examples in German:
1. Es regnet. Meaning, "It rains," or "It is raining."
2. Es ist kalt. Meaning, "It is cold."

In all of the above examples, the pronoun corresponding to English it (in French, il; in German es) does not point to a specific entity in the real world: it is neither a person, nor a "thing capable of participating in any way in the process of raining." (Although, as an interesting aside, Tesnière mentions that some believe avalent verbs began as monovalent verbs, where the subject referred to some divine being who was causing the weather. For example, in the Greek sentence, Ὅμηρος ὑπέλαβεν . . . ὗσαι τὸν Δία, meaning "Homer believed that Zeus was raining".) Tesnière states that the third person marker does not tell the listener/reader anything about the subject, because there is no concept of an actant (or agent) attached to it. Figure 1 shows a phrase structure tree of the English sentence It rains. While it does not appear to contribute any meaning to the sentence, it is still syntactically required to be present. For example, an English speaker cannot simply say, Rains, because attempting to pronounce the sentence without the pleonastic it renders the sentence ungrammatical. This ungrammatical instance arises from a violation of the Extended Projection Principle (EPP) which states that all tensed phrases must have a subject. In Figure 1, it occupies the subject (or, specifier) position of the tense phrase (TP), satisfying the EPP, and making the sentence It rains grammatical.

=== Avalent verbs in null-subject languages ===
Avalency is more clearly demonstrated in pro-drop languages, which do not grammatically require a dummy pronoun as English does.

- Examples in Latin:
1. Pluit. Meaning, "It rains," or "It is raining."
2. Ningit. Meaning, "It snows," or "It is snowing."
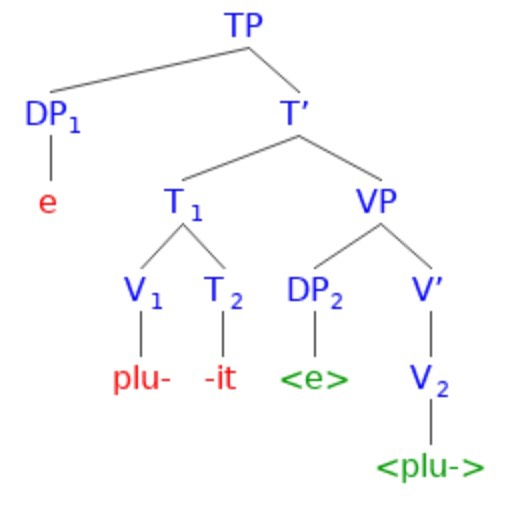
  Figure 2. Syntax phrase structure tree. This Latin sentence reads, "Pluit," which means "It rains" or "It is raining," in English. The angled brackets indicate syntactic movement. The tree was creating using phpSyntaxTree.
- Examples in Italian:
1. Piove. Meaning, "It rains," or "It is raining."
2. Nevica. Meaning, "It snows," or "It is snowing."
- Examples in Spanish:
1. llueve. Meaning, "It rains," or "It is raining."
2. Nieva. Meaning, "It snows," or "It is snowing."

Because none of the above examples have an overt, pronounced subject, they all appear to violate the EPP. However, null-subject languages allow phrases without an overt subject if the subject can easily be deduced by the context. Highly inflected languages, such as the above null-subject languages, may not need to insert expletive it the way that non-null-subject languages do (indeed, it would be agrammatical). The determiner phrase (DP) in Figure 2 is not overtly filled, hence it is marked with an e (empty) indicating that has no phonological content. This is allowed in null-subject languages because "overt agreement morphology licenses null subjects." This means that a morphologically rich language, such as Latin, uses inflections to indicate things such as, person and number (in the case of verbs), and so does not need to use a semantically void pronoun. For example, in the phrase in Figure 2, Pluit, the ending -t indicates that the verb is third person singular, thereby making the addition of a pronoun unnecessary.

== Analyses of avalent verbs ==
Although in English these verbs do have what seems to be a subject, it, it is arguably devoid of semantic meaning and merely a syntactic placeholder. For Tesnière, the it in the English sentence It rains, is merely an instance of expletive it insertion. Differing views of this use of it do exist, however, making it potentially a quasi-argument or simply a normal subject. Determining whether or not it counts as an argument will help to explain what verbs, if any, are truly avalent.

=== Chomsky's "weather it" analysis ===
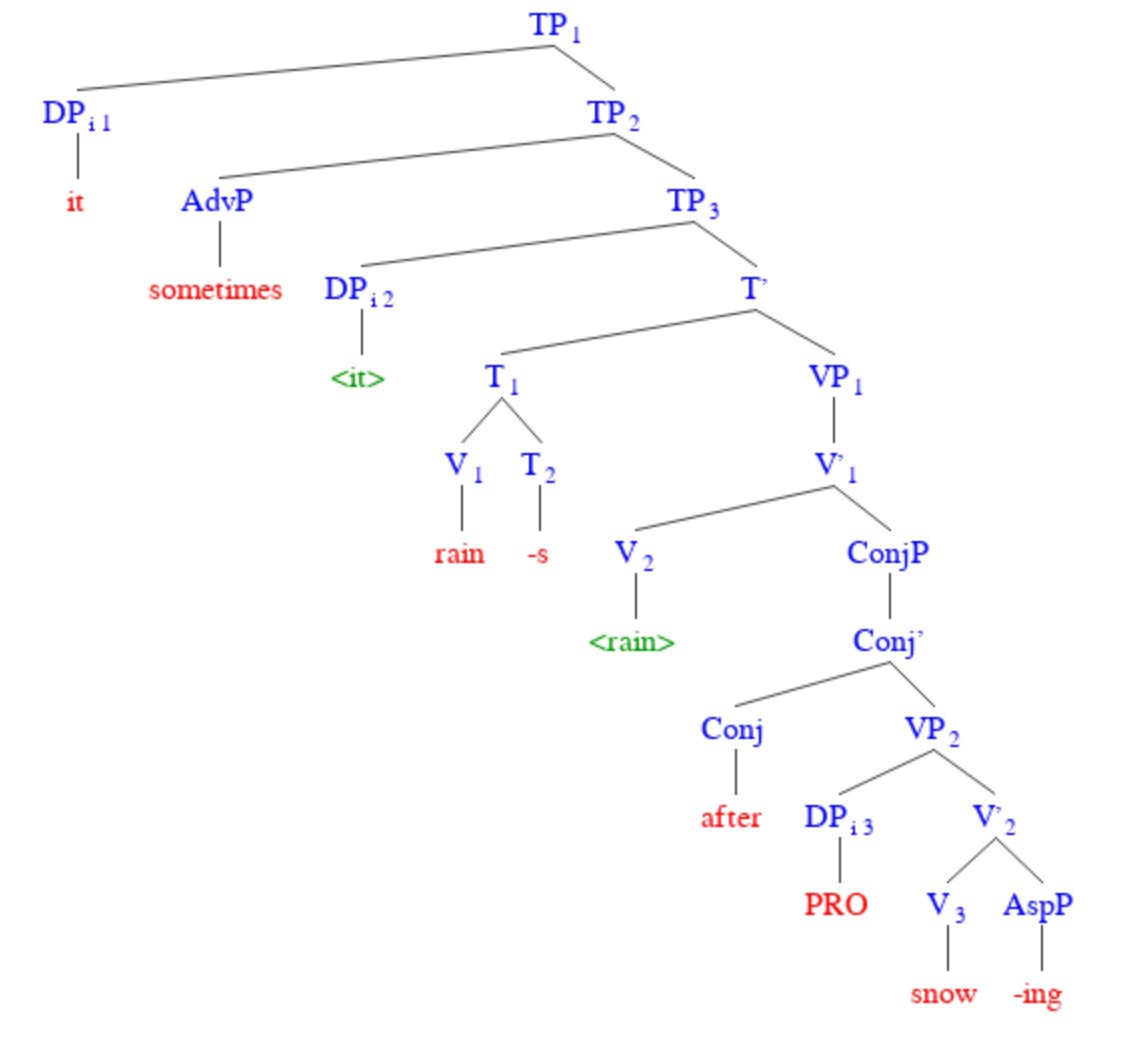
Figure 3. Syntax phrase structure tree using Chomsky's example sentence. This English sentence reads, "It sometimes rains after snowing." N.B. The angled brackets around green-coloured "it" and "rain" indicate syntactic movement. The tree was creating using phpSyntaxTree.

Noam Chomsky identifies two types of arguments, "true arguments" and "quasi-arguments". True arguments have the capacity to be referential, as in the example it is on the table. Here, the pronoun it is referential, that is, it refers back to something that exists in the real world. Quasi-arguments, on the other hand, are not true arguments in the sense that they do not possess referential qualities, but do behave like arguments in the sense that they can control PRO. Chomsky claims that "weather it" is a quasi-argument, as in the phrase It sometimes rains after [α snowing], where α represents PRO, which is controlled by weather it (see Figure 3). PRO typically takes on the "referential properties of its antecedent", but in this case the antecedent, weather it, is not referential. Conversely, he also identifies "non-arguments" which are not meaningful semantically, but do provide a syntactic function. In the phrase it seems that John is here, it is what Chomsky refers to as "pleonastic it," which is neither referential, nor does it ever govern PRO. (N.B. In the above example, while "seems" requires the insertion of pleonastic it, it cannot be truly be described as a verb of zero valence, because it takes the clause that John is here as its complement.) In English, if there is no meaningful subject, a pleonastic (such as it) must be inserted into the subject position in order to satisfy the Extended Projection Principle (EPP) which states that a tensed clause requires a subject. For Chomsky, "weather it" is neither a pleonastic, nor is it a true argument, it is a quasi-argument.

=== Bolinger's "ambient it" analysis ===
Dwight Bolinger posits that it is not simply a pleonastic, rather, it is a meaningful unit that is in fact referential. For Bolinger, the syntax trees in Figures 1, 2, and 3 would look the same structurally, but the difference would be that it is fully referential. It has as its referent the "environment that is central to the whole idea" of what is being discussed. He believes that it takes on the most general possible referent, and that its referent is usually unexpressed because it is meant to be obvious to the listener/hearer based on context. For example, with regards to expressions of weather, the it in the phrase It is hot, is "ambient" and refers to the general environment. The listener will correctly interpret it to be referring to the environment in which the speakers find themselves. In order to demonstrate that this general use of it is referential, he provides the following pair of questions and answers:

1. How is it in your room? It's hard to study.
2. How is it in your room? *To study is hard.

(N.B.The asterisk is a symbol meaning that the content following it is unattested/ungrammatical.) These examples demonstrate that, in this context, the occurrence of it in the first sentence is not simply an instance of extraposition (also called cleft construction), but refers back to the same it present in the question. The fact that the answer in the second set is unattested exemplifies the fact that the first is not a matter of extraposition. The phrase To study is hard is not ungrammatical in all contexts, but the fact that it is ungrammatical in this context shows that in order to answer the question How is it in your room? the person responding must make use of it in order for their answer to be grammatical. Therefore, according to Bolinger, it is neither a pleonastic, nor a quasi-argument, but a "nominal with the greatest possible generality of meaning," and says that it is incorrect to "confuse generality of meaning with lack of meaning." Under Bolinger's analysis of it, verbs like the above examples are not avalent, but monovalent, taking the true argument it as their subject.
