= Tigrinya verbs =

Verbs of the Semitic language

Unless otherwise indicated, Tigrinya verbs in this article are given in the usual citation form, the third-person singular masculine perfect.

== Roots ==
A Tigrinya verb root consists of a set of consonants (or "literals"), usually three, for example, {sbr} 'break' (citation form: ሰበረ säbärä), {drf} 'sing' (citation form: ደረፈ däräfä). Each three-consonant (or "triliteral") root belongs to one of three conjugation classes, conventionally known as A, B, and C, and analogous to the three conjugations of verbs in Romance languages. This division is a basic feature of Ethiopian Semitic languages. Most three-consonant roots are in the A class (referred to in this article as "3A"). In the citation form (perfect), these have no gemination and the vowel ä between both pairs of consonants. Examples are ሰበረ säbärä and ደረፈ däräfä. The B class (referred to in this article as "3B") is distinguished by the gemination of the second consonant in all forms. Examples are ደቀሰ däk'k'äsä 'sleep' and ወሰኸ wässäxä 'add'. The relatively few members of the C class (referred to in this article as "3C") take the vowel a between the first and second consonants. Examples are ባረኸ baräxä 'bless' and ናፈቐ nafäx'ä 'long for, miss'.

Tigrinya also has a significant number of four-consonant (or "quadriliteral") roots (referred to in this article as "4"). These fall into a single conjugation class. Examples are መስከረ mäskärä 'testify' and ቀልጠፈ k'ält'äfä 'hurry'.

The language also has five-consonant (or "quinquiliteral") roots (referred to in this article as "5"). Most, if not all, of these are "defective" in the sense described below; that is, their simplest form takes the tä- prefix. Examples are ተንቀጥቀጠ tä-nk'ät'k'ät'ä 'tremble' and ተምበርከኸ tä-mbärkäxä 'kneel'.

As is common in Semitic languages, roots containing "laryngeal" (that is, pharyngeal or glottal) consonants in any position or semivowels (y or w) in any but first position undergo various modifications. These are dealt with below under Conjugation.

== Derivation ==
Each verb root can be modified through one or more basic derivational processes. Each can be described in terms of its form and its function.

=== Form ===
Changes to the root form are of two types: prefixes and internal changes.

The prefixes are tä- and ’a- or their combination. When the prefix tä- follows ’a-, it loses its vowel and assimilates to the following consonant (that is, the first root consonant). Without ’a- its realization depends on the tense/aspect/mood of the verb.

Internal changes are of two types. One is a form of reduplication. This produces an extra syllable, consisting of a copy of the second consonant from the end of the root followed by the vowel a; this syllable appears third from the end of the verb stem. A second type of internal change inserts the vowel a, or replaces the existing vowel with a, following the third consonant from the end of the stem. For three-consonant roots, this results in a pattern similar to that of C class verbs.

The table below shows the possible combinations of prefixes and internal changes and their functions, illustrating each with the verb {sbr} (3A).

Tigrinya Verb Derivation
Prefix(es)	Internal change	Function	Examples	
—	—	ACTIVE	ሰበረ säbärä 'break'	
—	Reduplication	FREQUENTATIVE	ሰባበረ säbabärä 'break repeatedly'	
tä-	—	PASSIVE, REFLEXIVE	ተሰብረ tä-säbrä 'be broken'	
tä-	-a-	RECIPROCAL	ተሳበረ tä-sabärä	'break one another'
tä-	Reduplication	RECIPROCAL	ተሰባበረ tä-säbabärä	'break one another'
’a-	—	CAUSATIVE	ኣስበረ ’a-sbärä 'cause to break'	
’a- + -tä-	-a-	RECIPROCAL CAUSATIVE	ኣሳበረ ’a-s-sabärä	'cause to break one another'
’a- + -tä-	Reduplication	RECIPROCAL CAUSATIVE	ኣሰባበረ ’a-s-säbabärä	'cause to break one another'

=== Function ===
For the most part, the two derivational prefixes signal grammatical voice; that is, they govern how the participants in the sentence map onto the roles in the event conveyed by the verb. With neither prefix, the verb is normally in ACTIVE voice; the subject is the agent of the event. By itself, the prefix tä- usually signals PASSIVE voice or REFLEXIVE voice. Some participant which is not the subject of the active sentence, the patient or recipient, becomes the subject; or the subject is both the agent and the patient or recipient of the event. By itself, the prefix ’a- usually signals CAUSATIVE voice; the subject of the sentence is then a causer of the event who is not the immediate agent.

Reduplication with neither of the prefixes signals FREQUENTATIVE, the repetition of the event conveyed by the verb. Together with the prefix tä-, reduplication and internal -a- both signal RECIPROCAL; the subject, most often plural, represents both the agent and patient or recipient of the event. In English, and some other languages, the reciprocal is marked by a pronoun, 'each other'. The addition of ’a- to this patterns yields the RECIPROCAL CAUSATIVE: 'cause to DO to each other'.

Here are examples of the different derivational patterns, using the roots {sbr} (3A) 'break', {ls'y} (3C) 'shave', and sḥk (3A) 'laugh'. The verbs are all in the gerundive tense/aspect form.

- መስኮት ሰቢሩ mäskot säbiru 'He broke a window'; {sbr}, no prefix, no internal change, ACTIVE
- መስኮት (ብተኽሉ) ተሰቢሩ mäskot (bǝtäxlu) tä-säbiru 'a window was broken (by Teklu)'; {sbr}, tä-, no internal change, PASSIVE
- መስኮት ሰባቢሩ mäskot säbabiru 'He repeatedly broke windows'; {sbr}, no prefix, reduplication, FREQUENTATIVE
- መስኮት ኣስቢሩ mäskot ’a-sbiru 'He caused a window to be broken (by somebody else)'; {sbr}, ’a-, no internal change, CAUSATIVE
- ተላጺዩ tä-las'iyu 'He shaved (himself)'; {ls'y}, tä-, no internal change, REFLEXIVE
- ተሳሒቖም tä-saḥix'om / ተሰሓሒቖም tä-säḥaḥix'om 'they (m.) laughed at each other'; sḥk, tä-, -a- / reduplication, RECIPROCAL
- ኣሳሒቑዎም ’a'-s-saḥix'uwwom / ኣሰሐሒቑዎም ’a-s-säḥaḥix'uwwom 'he made them (m.) laugh at each other'; {sḥk}, ’a- + tä-, -a- / reduplication, RECIPROCAL CAUSATIVE

=== Defective verbs ===
Some verb roots are defective in the sense that they must occur with either or both of the derivational prefixes. For example, from the root {k'mt'} (3B) 'sit' there are the forms täx'ämmät'ä 'sit', ax'ämmät'ä 'cause to sit, put' but no form *k'ämmät'ä. Other examples: {ktl} (3B) täxättälä 'follow', {zrb} (3C) täzaräbä 'speak', {ggy} (3C) tägagäyä 'err'. Note that the tä- does not necessarily signify passive or reflexive with these verbs.

== Tense, aspect, and mood ==
The pattern of vowels between the consonants of a verb root, as well as the gemination of one or more consonants in some cases, is determined in part by the verb class (3A, 3B, 3C, 4, 5) and the presence (or absence) of derivational morphemes (ACTIVE, PASSIVE, RECIPROCAL, etc.). But it also depends on the selection of the tense/aspect or mood.

Most Semitic languages make a basic two-way distinction between a tense/aspect stem that is conjugated with suffixes and another stem that is conjugated with prefixes and, in some forms, suffixes as well. In Ethiopian Semitic and in Arabic, the first, known as the perfective, is used for past tense, and the second, known as the imperfective, is used for present and sometimes future tenses.

In Tigrinya the bare imperfective is used mainly for the habitual present: ኩሉ መዓልቲ መስኮት ይሰብር kullu mä‘alti mäskot yǝsäbbǝr 'he breaks a window every day'. In other present and future contexts, auxiliaries are usually used along with the imperfective.

Ethiopian Semitic and Arabic verbs also have a third possibility, which like the imperfective is conjugated with prefixes and sometimes suffixes. This form, known as the jussive/imperative, is tenseless; it is used to express the imperative mood in the second person as well as notions such as 'let him DO', 'that he DO' in the first and third persons. In Ethiopian Semitic, the affirmative imperative drops the prefix, but the negative imperative maintains it. For example, in Tigrinya ንስበር nǝ-sbär 'let's break', ስበራ sǝbär-a 'break! (2p.f.pl.)', ኣየትስበራ ay-tǝ-sbär-a 'don't break! (2p.f.pl.)'.

Some Ethiopian Semitic languages, including Tigrinya, have a fourth possibility, known (somewhat confusingly) as the gerund or gerundive, which like the perfective is conjugated with suffixes only. As in Amharic, this form in Tigrinya has a tenseless, linking function: '(after) having DONE...', '...DO and (then)...'. In Tigrinya it has an additional and very important function: it is the usual way to express the affirmative past tense in independent clauses, the perfective being restricted mainly to the past negative and to verbs preceded by subordinating conjunctions and the relativizer zǝ-.

Examples:

መስኮት ሰቢሩ ሃዲሙ
mäskot säbiru hadimu
window {break (3SG.M, GER)} {escape (3SG.M, GER)}
'He broke a window and escaped.'

እቲ መስኮት ዝሰበረ ወዲ
ǝti mäskot zǝ-säbärä wäddi
the window {REL-break (3SG.M, PRF)} boy
'the boy who broke a window'

መስኮት ኣይሰበረን
mäskot ay-säbärä-n
window {NEG-break (3SG.M, PRF)}
'He didn't break a window.'

== Conjugation ==
Tigrinya has separate suffixes, prefixes, or combinations of prefixes and suffixes for each of the ten person/number/gender combinations that are distinguished within the personal pronoun system. These are illustrated in the table below for the verb {flt'} (3A) 'know' in its ACTIVE form, that is, without derivational prefixes or internal changes.

For the second person jussive/imperative, the tǝ- prefix appears in parentheses because it is used only in the negative. Note that for verbs in the 3A class, the second consonant is geminated in the imperfect when there is no suffix.

Tigrinya Verb Conjugation: ACTIVE, Class 3A
	Perfect	Imperfect	Jussive/ Imperative	Gerundive
I	ፈለጥኩ fälät'-ku	እፈልጥ ’ǝ-fällǝt'	እፍለጥ ’ǝ-flät'	ፈሊጠ felit'-ä
you (m.sg.)	ፈለጥካ fälät'-ka	ትፈልጥ tǝ-fällǝt'	(ት)ፍለጥ (tǝ-)flät'	ፈሊትካ felit'-ka
you (f.sg.)	ፈለጥኪ fälät'-ki	ትፈልጢ tǝ-fält'-i	(ት)ፍለጢ (tǝ-)flät'-i	ፈሊጥኪ felit'-ki
he	ፈለጠ fälät'-ä	ይፈልጥ yǝ-fällǝt'	ይፍለጥ yǝ-flät'	ፈሊጡ felit'-u
she	ፈለጠት fälät'-ät	ትፈልጥ tǝ-fällǝt'	ትፍለጥ tǝ-flät'	ፈሊጣ felit'-a
we	ፈለጥና fälät'-na	ንፈልጥ nǝ-fällǝt'	ንፍለጥ nǝ-flät'	ፈሊጥና felit'-na
you (m.pl.)	ፈለጥኩም fälät'-kum	ትፈልጡ tǝ-fält'-u	(ት)ፍለጡ ((tǝ-)flät'-u	ፈሊጥኩም felit'-kum
you (f.pl.)	ፈለጥክን fälät'-kǝn	ትፈልጣ tǝ-fält'-a	(ት)ፍለጣ ((tǝ-)flät'-a	ፈሊጥክን felit'-kin
they (m.)	ፈለጡ fälät'-u	ይፈልጡ yǝ-fält'-u	ይፍለጡ yǝ-flät'-u	ፈሊጦም felit'-om
they (f.)	ፈለጣ fälät'-a	ይፈልጣ yǝ-fält'-a	ይፍለጣ yǝ-flät'-a	ፈሊጠን felit'-en

The same subject agreement affixes appear in the various derivational patterns, but the verb stems are not predictable from the simple, ACTIVE stems.

The derivational prefixes tä- and ’a- undergo various changes when they are preceded by subject agreement affixes. In the imperative/jussive, tä- assimilates to the first consonant of the verb root (except when there is no prefix in the affirmative imperative). In the imperfect, tä- disappears altogether, though its presence can still be detected from the pattern of vowels and gemination in the verb stem. The first person imperfect and jussive prefix ’ǝ merges with a following ’a-, and the vowel of the other prefixes (tǝ, yǝ, nǝ) merges with a following ’a-, yielding the vowel -ä.

The perfect stem following tä- may lose the vowel between the second and third root consonants when the suffix begins with a vowel (ተፈልጠ tä-fält'-ä 'he was known'; ተፈለጥኩ tä-fälät'-ku 'I was known').

The table below shows forms for the verb {flt'} (3A) 'know' in each of the possible combinations of derivational prefixes and internal changes. Unless otherwise indicated, the forms given are the third person masculine plural for the RECIPROCAL pattern and the third person masculine singular for the other patterns.

Tigrinya Verb Conjugation: Derived Forms, Class 3A
Derivational pattern	Perfect	Imperfect	Jussive/ Imperative	Gerundive
FREQUENTATIVE	ፈላለጠ fälalät'-ä	ይፈላልጥ yǝ-fä'lalǝt		ፈላሊጡ fälalit'-u
PASSIVE/REFLEXIVE	ተፈለጥኩ tä-fälät'-ku (1p.sg.) ተፈልጠ tä-fält'-ä	ይፍለጥ yǝ-fǝllät'	ይፈለጥ yǝ-f-fälät' ተፈለጥ tä-fälät' (2p.m.sg.)	ተፈሊጡ tä-fälit'-u
RECIPROCAL	ተፋለጡ tä-falät'-u ተፈላለጡ tä-fälalät'-u	ይፋለጡ yǝ-f-falät'-u ይፈላለጡ yǝ-f-fälalät'-u		ተፋሊጦም tä-falit'-om ተፈላሊጦም tä-fälalit'-om
CAUSATIVE	ኣፍለጠ ’a-flät'-ä	የፍልጥ y-ä-fǝllǝt' የፍልጡ y-ä-fǝlt'-u (3p.m.pl.)	የፍልጥ y-ä-flǝt'	ኣፍሊጡ ’a-flit'-u
RECIPROCAL CAUSATIVE	ኣፋለጠ ’a-f-falät'-ä ኣፈላለጠ ’a-f-fälalät'-ä	የፋለጥ y-ä-f-falǝt' የፈላለጥ y-ä-f-fälalǝt'		ኣፋሊጡ ’a-f-falit'-u ኣፈላሊጡ ’a-f-fälalit'-u'

The subject agreement affixes are the same for verbs in other conjugation classes, but the stems differ in some cases from what would be expected for a verb in the 3A class like fälät'ä. The table below shows the third person singular masculine ACTIVE forms for verbs in other classes: {bdl} (3B) 'offend', {mrk} (3C) 'capture', {t'rt'r} (4) 'doubt'.

Verbs whose roots contain "laryngeal" (pharyngeal or glottal: ‘, ḥ, ’, h) consonants in any position or semivowels (w or y) in any position other than first deviate in various ways from the patterns shown in the tables above. For the laryngeals, most of these deviations stem from the fact that the vowel ä never occurs immediately after a laryngeal. For the semivowels, the deviations result from simplifications that occur when these consonants are preceded and followed by vowels. Some of the changes are illustrated in the following table for these seven verbs, all in the 3A class: {hdm} 'escape', {s‘m} 'kiss', {srḥ} 'do, work', {mwt} 'die', {ftw} 'like', {kyd} 'go', {sty} 'drink'. There is considerable variation in the forms; only one possibility is shown here. Third person singular masculine is given in each case, and in addition the first person singular (in the perfect) or third person masculine plural (in the imperfect) for cases where the stem changes within the paradigm.

The very common verbs {nbr} 'live, be' and {gbr} 'do' undergo simplifications in the gerundive, where the b is deleted: ነይሩ näyru, ገይሩ gäyru (3p.m.sg.); ኔርካ nerka, ጌርካ gerka (2p.m.sg.); etc.

Tigrinya has four genuinely irregular verbs: {bhl} 'say', {whb} 'give', {tḥz} 'hold', and {hlw} 'exist'. For the first three of these, which are conjugated similarly, the third personal singular masculine forms are shown in the following table. The verb of existence is discussed in a separate section.

Tigrinya Verb Conjugation: ACTIVE; Classes 3B, 3C, 4, Laryngeal and Semivowel Root Consonants, Irregular
Conjugation class	Perfect	Imperfect	Jussive/ Imperative	Gerundive
3B	በደለ bäddäl-ä	ይብድል yǝ-bǝddǝl	ይበድል yǝ-bäddǝl	በዲሉ bäddil-u
3C	ማረኸ maräx-ä	ይማርኽ yǝ-marǝx	ይማርኽ yǝ-marǝx	ማሪኹ marix-u
4	ጠርጠረ t'ärt'är-ä	ይጥርጥር yǝ-t'ǝrt'ǝr	ይጠርጥር yǝ-t'ärt'ǝr	ጠርጢሩ t'ärt'ir-u
Laryngeal	ሃደመ hadäm-ä ሰዓመ sä‘am-ä ሰራሕኩ säraḥ-ku, ሰርሔ särḥ-e	ይሃድም yǝ-haddǝm ይስዕም yǝ-sǝ‘ǝm ይሰርሕ yǝ-särrǝḥ	ይህደም yǝ-hdäm ይስዓም yǝ-s‘am ይስራሕ yǝ-sraḥ	ሃዲሙ hadim-u ስዒሙ sǝ‘im-u ሰሪሑ säriḥ-u
Semivowel	ሞተ mot-ä ፈቶኹ fäto-xu, ፈተወ fätäw-ä ከደ käd-ä ሰቴኹ säte-xu, ሰተየ sätäy-ä	ይመውት yǝ-mäwwǝt, ይሞቱ yǝ-mot-u ይፈቱ yǝ-fättu, ይፈትዉ yǝ-fätw-u ይኸይድ yǝ-xäyyǝd, ይኸዱ yǝ-xäd-u ይሰቲ yǝ-sätti, ይሰትዩ yǝ-säty-u	ይሙት yǝ-mut ይፍተው yǝ-ftäw ይኺድ yǝ-xid ይስተይ yǝ-stäy	ሞይቱ moyt-u ፈትዩ fäty-u ከይዱ käyd-u ሰትዩ säty-u
Irregular	በለ bälä ሃበ habä ሓዘ ḥazä	ይብል yǝbǝl ይህብ yǝhǝb ይሕዝ yǝḥǝz	ይበል yǝbäl ይሃብ yǝhab ይሓዝ yǝḥaz	ኢሉ ’ilu ሂቡ hibu ሒዙ ḥizu

== Object suffixes ==
Like other Semitic languages, Tigrinya has object pronoun suffixes that can appear on verbs in any tense-aspect-mood. As discussed under personal pronouns, there are two sets of such suffixes in the language, a set used for direct objects and a "prepositional" set used for dative, benefactive, locative, or adversative meanings ('to', 'for', 'against'); only one object suffix is permitted on a given verb.

As in some other Ethiopian Semitic languages, there are separate "light" and "heavy" suffixes for all but the second person and first-person plural prepositional object forms. The light suffixes (-ni, -xa, etc.) are characterized by initial ungeminated consonants and the heavy suffixes (-nni, -kka, etc.) by initial geminated consonants. For the third person direct object suffixes, there is a third form with no initial consonant at all (-o, -a, etc.). Roughly speaking, the light suffixes are used with verbs whose subjects are second or third person plural, the third person vowel-initial suffixes are used with verbs that have no agreement suffix, and the heavy suffixes are used in other cases. In the jussive/imperative, the vowel-initial suffixes cause the gemination of the preceding consonant. When an object suffix beginning with a consonant is added to a verb ending in a consonant (either a root or a suffix consonant), a vowel is inserted to break up the cluster, the particular vowel depending on the subject and object. The details are quite complicated; most of the possibilities are illustrated in the following table for two different object and four different subject categories, using the verb fälät'ä (3A) 'know'.

Tigrinya Object Suffix Pronouns
Object	Subject	Perfect	Imperfect	Jussive/ Imperative	Gerundive
'me'	'you(m.sg.)'	ፈለጥካኒ fälät'ka-nni	ትፈልጠኒ tǝfält'-ä-nni	ፍለጠኒ fǝlät'-ä-nni	ፈሊጥካኒ fälit'ka-nni
'me'	'he'	ፈለጠኒ fälät'ä-nni	ይፈልጠኒ yǝfält'-ä-nni	ይፍለጠኒ yǝflät'-ä-nni	ፈሊጡኒ fälit'u-nni
'me'	'they(m.)'	ፈለጡኒ fälät'u-ni	ይፈልጡኒ yǝfält'u-ni	ይፍለጡኒ yǝflät'u-ni	ፈሊጦሙኒ fälit'om-u-ni
'me'	'they(f.)'	ፈለጣኒ fälät'a-ni	ይፈልጣኒ yǝfält'a-ni	ይፍለጣኒ yǝflät'a-ni	ፈሊጠናኒ fälit'än-a-ni
'him'	'you(m.sg.)'	ፈለጥካዮ fälät'ka-yyo	ትፈልጦ tǝfält'-o	ፍለጦ fǝlät'-t'-o	ፈሊጥካዮ fälit'ka-yyo
'him'	'he'	ፈለጦ fälät'-o	ይፈልጦ yǝfält'-o	ይፍለጦ yǝflät'-t'-o	ፈሊጡዎ fälit'u-wwo
'him'	'they(m.)'	ፈለጡዎ fälät'u-wo	ይፈልጡዎ yǝfält'u-wo	ይፍለጡዎ yǝflät'u-wo	ፈሊጦሙዎ fälit'om-u-wo
'him'	'they(f.)'	ፈለጣኦ fälät'a-’o	ይፈልጣኦ yǝfält'a-’o	ይፍለጣኦ yǝflät'a-’o	ፈሊጠንኦ fälit'än-ǝ-’o

== Negation ==
Verbs are negated in Tigrinya with the prefix ኣይ ay-, and, in independent tensed clauses, the suffix ን -n. The negative prefix precedes any derivational or subject agreement prefixes, and the negative suffix follows any subject agreement or object pronoun suffixes. The first person singular imperfect and jussive prefix ’ǝ is dropped following ay-. The gerundive has no negative; the negative of the perfect is used instead. Examples:

- Perfect: ተዓጸወ tä‘as'äwä 'it was closed', ኣይተዓጸወን ay-tä‘as'äwä-n 'it wasn't closed'
- Imperfect: ትፈልጥኒ tǝfält'ǝnni 'you (f.sg.) know me', ኣይትፈልጥንን ay-tǝfält'ǝnnǝ-n 'you (f.sg.) don't know me'
- Imperative: ክፈቶ kǝfätto 'open (m.sg.) it', ኣይትክፈቶ ay-tǝkfätto 'don't open (m.sg.) it'
- Gerundive: ተጋግየ tägagǝyä 'I made a mistake', ኣይተጋጌኹን ay-tägagexu-n 'I didn't make a mistake' (perfect)

== Copula and verb of existence ==
Like other Ethiopian Semitic languages, Tigrinya has a copula ('be') and a separate verb of existence and location ('exist, be located'), neither of which is conjugated like other verbs. For the present tense, both the copula and the verb of existence use forms with subject agreement suffixes rather than anything resembling the imperfect. The present of the verb of existence can take conjunctive prefixes, in which case its initial ’a is absorbed: እንተሎ ǝntällo 'if there is', ዘለዉ zälläwu 'which there are'. The copula cannot take conjunctive prefixes; instead, forms of the regular verb ኮነ konä 'become' are used: እንተኾነ ǝntäxonä if he is, becomes', ዝኾነ zǝxonä 'which is, becomes'. The perfect or gerundive of the regular verb ነበረ näbärä 'live' normally serves as the past tense of both the copula and the verb of existence: ምሳና ኣይነበረን mǝsana aynäbäran 'they (f.) weren't with us'. The verbs ኮነ konä, ነበረ näbärä, and ሃለወ halläwä (a regular verb with restricted use meaning 'exist' and the historical source of allo, etc.) replace the copula and verb of existence in other grammatical roles: ይኹኑ yǝxunu 'let them (m.) be' (jussive), ኪነብር እዩ kinäbbǝr ǝyyu 'he will be (there)' (near future), ምህላውካ mǝhǝllawka 'your (m.sg.) being (there)' (infinitive).

With object pronoun suffixes, the verb of existence conveys possession; the object represents the possessor and the subject of the verb the possessed entity. Thus there are four ways to express 'have' for a given subject, depending on the number and gender of the possessed entity: ኣሎኒ allo-ni (m.sg.), ኣላትኒ allat-ǝ-nni (f.sg.), ኣለዉኒ alläwu-ni (m.pl.), ኣለዋኒ alläwa-ni (f.pl.) 'I have'. The same form is used to express obligation; the subject takes the form of an infinitive, the subject agreement is third person masculine singular, and the object suffix represents the obliged person: ምድቃስ ኣሎኒ mǝdǝqqas allo-nni, 'I have to sleep'.

The following table shows the affirmative and negative present forms of the copula and verb of existence. In the second person forms of the copula, the first vowel may be either ǝ and i. The 'o' in the verbs of existence is often replaced by 'ä' in all forms except the third person masculine singular.

Tigrinya Copula and Verb of Existence, Present Tense
	Copula 'am', 'are', 'is', etc.		Verb of existence 'am (located)', etc.		Verb of existence + obj. pron. 'have, must'	
	Affirmative	Negative	Affirmative	Negative	Affirmative	Negative
I	እየ ’ǝyyä	ኣይኮንኩን ’aykonkun	ኣሎኹ ’alloxu	የሎኹን yälloxun	ኣሎኒ ’allonni	የብለይን yäbǝlläyǝn
you (m.sg.)	እኻ ’ǝxa, ኢኻ ’ixa	ኣይኮንካን ’aykonkan	ኣሎኻ ’alloxa	የሎኻን yälloxan	ኣሎካ ’allokka	የብልካን yäbǝlkan
you (f.sg.)	እኺ ’ǝxi, ኢኺ ’ixi	ኣይኮንክን ’aykonkǝn	ኣሎኺ ’alloxi	የሎኽን yälloxǝn	ኣሎኪ ’allokki	የብልክን yäbǝlkǝn
he	እዩ ’ǝyyu	ኣይኮነን ’aykonän	ኣሎ ’allo	የሎን yällon, የልቦን yälbon	ኣሎዎ ’allowwo	የብሉን yäbǝllun
she	እያ ’ǝyya	ኣይኮነትን ’aykonätǝn	ኣላ ’alla	የላን yällan	ኣሎዋ ’allowwa	የብላን yäbǝllan
we	ኢና ’ina	ኣይኮንናን ’aykonnan	ኣሎና ’allona	የሎናን yällonan	ኣሎና ’allonna	የብልናን yäbǝlnan
you (m.pl.)	እኹም ’ǝxum, ኢኹም ’ixum	ኣይኮንኩምን ’aykonkumǝn	ኣሎኹም ’alloxum	የሎኹምን yälloxumǝn	ኣሎኩም ’allokkum	የብልኩምን yäbǝlkumǝn
you (f.pl.)	እኽን ’ǝxǝn, ኢኽን ’ixǝn	ኣይኮንክን ’aykonkǝnǝn	ኣሎኽን ’alloxǝn	የሎኽንን yälloxǝnǝn	ኣሎክን ’allokkǝn	የብልክንን yäbǝlkǝnǝn
they (m.)	እዮም ’ǝyyom	ኣይኮኑን ’aykonun	ኣለዉ ’alläwu	የለዉን yälläwun	ኣሎዎም ’allowwom	የብሎምን yäbǝllomǝn
they (f.)	እየን ’ǝyyän	ኣይኮናን ’aykonan	ኣለዋ ’alläwa	የለዋን yälläwan	ኣሎወን ’allowwän	የብለንን yäbǝllänǝn

== Relativization ==
Tigrinya forms relative clauses by prefixing zǝ- to the perfect or imperfect form of a verb. The irregular present of the verb of existence (ኣሎ ’allo, etc.) may also take the prefix, in which case it combines with the initial ’a- to yield zä-: ዘሎ zällo 'which exists, is located', etc. The relativizing prefix precedes subject agreement, derivational, and negative prefixes. The prefix undergoes the following changes immediately preceding particular prefixes.

- Imperfect and jussive subject agreement prefixes
  - zǝ- + ’ǝ- (1p.sg.): zǝ-, e.g., ዝገብርሉ zǝgäbrǝllu 'with which I do (it)'
  - zǝ- + yǝ- (3p.m.sg., 3p.pl.): zi- or zǝ-, e.g., ዚቈርጹ zix'ʷärs'u 'which they (m.) cut'
  - zǝ- + tǝ- (2p., 3p.f.sg.): zǝttǝ- or ’ǝttǝ-, e.g., እትርእያ ’ǝttǝrǝ’ya 'which you (f.pl.) see'
  - zǝ- + nǝ- (1p.pl.): zǝnnǝ- or ’ǝnnǝ-, e.g., e.g., እንጽሕፍ ’ǝnnǝs'ǝḥǝf 'which we write'
- Derivational prefixes
  - zǝ- + ’a- (causative): zä-, e.g., ዘምጻእኩ zäms'a’ku 'which I brought (caused to come)'
  - zǝ- + tä- (passive): ’ǝttä- (or zǝtä-), e.g., እተሓተመ ’ǝttäḥatämä 'which was printed'
- Negative prefix
  - zǝ- + ’ay-: zäy-, e.g., ዘይንደሊ zäynǝdälli 'which we don't want'

Relative clauses may occur without an explicit antecedent: ዝሰበርኩ zǝsäbärku 'what I broke', ዚብላዕ zibǝlla‘ 'what is eaten'

As in other Ethiopian Semitic languages very common use of relative clauses is in cleft sentences. The main verb of the corresponding unclefted sentence is replaced by a relative clause and copula, and the relative clause often comes last in the sentence.

- ሓፍተይ እያ ዝኸደት ḥaftäy ’ǝyya zǝxädät 'it is my sister who left' (lit. 'she is my sister who left')
- መን እዩ ዝፈለጠ män ǝyyu zǝ-fälät'ä 'who knew?' (lit. 'who is he who knew?')

== Auxiliary verbs ==
Tigrinya has a complex set of possibilities for expressing tense and aspect distinctions . Besides the simple perfect, imperfect, and gerundive, other possibilities consist of combinations of these three with different auxiliary verbs — the copula (እዩ ’ǝyyu, etc.), the present of the verb of existence (ኣሎ ’allo, etc.), the verb ነበረ näbärä 'live, be', the verb ኮነ konä 'become, be', and the verb ጸንሔ s'änḥe 'stay' — and sometimes with particular conjunctive prefixes such as kǝ-. In most cases both the auxiliary verb and the main verb are conjugated. Some of the more common patterns are the following:

- imperfect + copula

The usual present tense for emotion and sense verbs: እፈትዋ እየ ’ǝfätwa ’ǝyyä 'I like her'.

- imperfect + näbärä

Corresponds to the English past progressive: ንሰቲ ነበርና nǝsätti näbärna 'we were drinking'.

- gerundive + present of verb of existence or copula

Corresponds to the English present perfect: መጺኣ ኣላ mäs'i’a ’alla 'she has come'.

- gerundive + näbärä

Corresponds to the English past perfect: ከይዶም ነበሩ käydom näbäru 'they (m.) had gone'

- imperfect + present verb of existence

Corresponds to English present progressive: ይጻወታ ኣለዋ yǝs's'awäta ’alläwa 'they (f.) are playing'. (Note how this differs from the corresponding form in Amharic, which is the normal main clause present tense.)

- kǝ- + imperfect + copula

The usual future tense: ክዕድጎ እየ kǝ‘ǝddǝgo ’ǝyyä 'I'm going to buy it'

== Bibliography ==
- Amanuel Sahle (1998) Säwasäsǝw Tǝgrǝñña bǝsäfiḥ. Lawrencevill, NJ, USA: Red Sea Press. ISBN 1-56902-096-5
- Dan'el Täxlu Räda (1996, Eth. Cal.) Zäbänawi säwasəw kʷ'ankʷ'a Təgrəñña. Mäx'älä
- Leslau, Wolf (1941) Documents tigrigna: grammaire et textes. Paris: Libraire C. Klincksieck.
- Mason, John (Ed.) (1996) Säwasǝw Tǝgrǝñña, Tigrinya grammar. Lawrenceville, NJ, USA: Red Sea Press. ISBN 0-932415-20-2 (ISBN 0-932415-21-0, paperback)
- Praetorius, F. (1871) Grammatik der Tigriñasprache in Abessinien. Halle. ISBN 3-487-05191-5 (1974 reprint)
- Voigt, Rainer Maria (1977). Das tigrinische Verbalsystem. Berlin: Verlag von Dietrich Reimer.
