= Persian verbs =

Verbs in the Persian language

Persian verbs (Persian: فعل‌های فارسی, romanized: Fe’lhā-ye fārsi, pronounced [feʔlˈhɒːje fɒːɾˈsiː]) or (Persian: کارواژه, romanized: Kār-vāzhe) are very regular compared with those of most European languages. From the two stems given in dictionaries (e.g. gir, gereft 'take, took', nevis, nevešt 'write, wrote', deh, dād 'give, gave' etc.) it is possible to derive all the other forms of almost any verb. The main irregularity is that given one stem it is not usually possible to predict the other.

Verbs can be conjugated for three persons, with each distinguishing between singular and plural. There are also nonfinite forms, such as the perfect participle, which has an active meaning for intransitive verbs, e.g. rafte 'gone', but a passive meaning for transitive verbs, e.g. nevešte 'written (by someone)'. This participle is also used to make the passive voice of transitive verbs when used with forms of the verb šodan 'to become'.

There are a variety of verb forms used to refer to past events. A series of past constructions (past simple, imperfect, and pluperfect) is matched by a corresponding series of perfect constructions (perfect simple, perfect continuous, and perfect pluperfect — the last of these made by adding a perfect ending to the pluperfect construction). These perfect constructions are used sometimes much as the English perfect construction (e.g. 'I have done' etc.), but often in an inferential or reportative sense ('apparently I had done' etc.), similar to the perfect construction in Turkish.

The simple present has a range of meanings (habitual, progressive, punctual, historic). In colloquial Persian this construction is also used with future meaning, although there also exists a separate future construction used in formal styles. In colloquial Persian there are also three progressive constructions (present, past, and perfect).

In colloquial Persian, commonly used verbs tend to be pronounced in an abbreviated form, for example ast 'he is' is pronounced e, miravad 'he goes' is pronounced mire, and miguyam 'I say' is pronounced migam (compare to e.g. "gonna" in English, which is an abbreviated form of "going to"). Also, compound verbs, such as bāz kardan 'to open' (lit. 'to make open'; 'make' is acting as a light verb) and yād gereftan 'to learn', are very frequent in modern Persian.

Persian verbs usually come at the ends of clauses, although there are sometimes exceptions. For example, in colloquial Persian, it is common to hear phrases such as raftam Tehrān 'I went to Tehran' where the destination follows the verb.

== Infinitives and stems ==
Infinitives end in تن (-tan) or دن (-dan). The principal parts of a verb are the infinitive stem and present stem. The infinitive stem (often called the past stem) is made simply by removing the ن (-an) from the infinitive:

- کردن (kardan, 'to make/to do') - کرد (kard)
- داشتن (dāštan, 'to have') - داشت (dāšt)
- گرفتن (gereftan, 'to take') - گرفت (gereft)
- دیدن (didan, 'to see') - دید (did)
- نوشتن (neveštan 'to write') - نوشت (nevešt)
- رفتن (raftan 'to go') - رفت (raft)
- شدن (šodan 'to become') - شد (šod)

The present stem tends to vary more, and in many common verbs bears little resemblance to the infinitive stem:

- کردن (kardan) - کن (kon)
- داشتن (dāštan) - دار (dār)
- گرفتن (gereftan) - گیر (gir)
- دیدن (didan) - بین (bin)
- نوشتن (neveštan) - نويس (nevis)
- رفتن (raftan) - رو (rav or ro)
- شدن (šodan) - شو (šav or šo)

The present indicative, present subjunctive, and present participle are made from the present stem, while the other verb forms are made from the infinitive stem. Both stems can be used to make verbal nouns such as گفتگو goftogu (or goftegu) 'dialogue', رفت وآمد raft o āmad 'going and coming', خوشنویس xošnevis 'calligrapher'.

The infinitive itself differs in usage from the English infinitive; for example, the subjunctive not the infinitive is used in sentences such as 'I want to go' or 'I am able to go'. The Persian infinitive is more like a verbal noun or gerund, used in phrases such as نوشتن اين کتاب neveštan-e in ketāb 'the writing of this book' or اختراع نوشتن exterā'-e neveštan 'the invention of writing'.

Note that in the transliteration used in this article, the letter 'x' represents a velar fricative sound, similar to the Peninsular Spanish 'j' as in 'jota', and 'š' and 'č' represent the sounds of English 'sh' and 'ch'.

== Participles ==
Persian verbs have two participles - perfect and present.

The perfect participle is formed by adding ه -e to the infinitive stem. It is passive in transitive verbs but active in intransitive verbs (e.g. rafte 'gone').

- کردن (kardan) - کرده (karde) 'done' or 'made'
- گرفتن (gereftan) - گرفته (gerefte) 'taken'
- دیدن (didan, to see) - دیده (dide) 'seen'
- نوشتن (neveštan 'to write') - نوشته (nevešte) 'written'

As well as being used to make the perfect constructions, the perfect participle can be used as an adjective or noun:

- ماهِ گذشته māh-e gozašte 'the past month', i.e. 'last month'
- نوشته‌هاى او neveštehā-ye u 'his writings'

The present participle, which is less common, is formed by adding نده -ande to the present stem. Usually this is used as an agent noun (e.g. نويسنده nevisande 'writer'), though sometimes it is a verbal adjective (e.g. سال آينده sāl-e āyande 'the coming year', i.e. 'next year'). A true participle ending in -ān (e.g. خندان xandān 'smiling') also exists for some verbs.

== Personal endings ==
Personal forms of verbs are formed mostly with simple suffixes. The personal suffixes for the present and future constructions and the two subjunctive constructions are:

- ـم (-am): first person singular ("I") ( hastam)
- ـی (-i): second person singular ("you sg." (informal))
- ـد (-ad): third person singular; colloquially pronounced -e ("he, she, it")
- ـیم (-im): first person plural ("we")
- ـید (-id): second person plural; colloquially pronounced -in ("you" (plural or respectful))
- ـند (-and): third person plural; colloquially pronounced -an ("they"; "he/she" (respectful))

The 2nd and 3rd persons plural may refer to singular persons for added respect. One major exception is God, for whom plural forms are never used.

The past, imperfect, and pluperfect constructions have very similar endings, except that there is no ending in the 3rd person singular:

- ـم (-am): first person singular
- ـی (-i): second person singular
- - ( - ): third person singular
- ـیم (-im): first person plural
- ـید (-id): second person plural), colloquially pronounced -in
- ـند (-and): third person plural, colloquially pronounced -an

These same endings are used for the verbs هست hast 'he is' and نيست nist 'he isn't', despite them being present constructions.

There is no ending in the 3rd person singular, but often in informal speech, the suffix -eš (lit. 'his/her') is added to supply the gap, e.g. goft-eš 'he said'.

The perfect forms have the following personal endings:

- ـه‌ام (-e am): first person singular
- ـه‌ای (-e i): second person singular informal
- ـه (-e): third person singular
- ـه‌ايم (-e im): first person plural
- ـه‌ايد (-e id): second person plural
- ـه‌اند (-e and): third person plural

Examples of various constructions are given below using the verb کردن kardan 'to do'. Note that personal pronouns are frequently dropped and are provided here for clarity.

== Present constructions ==
=== Simple present ===
The simple present is formed by prefixing می mi- to the present stem with personal endings (for stems ending with vowels, a y- is added before the personal ending)(kardan, ‘to make/do’; present stem - kon):

- من می‌کنم man mikonam 'I do'
- تو می‌کنی to mikoni 'you do' - singular
- او می‌کند u mikonad 'he/she/it does'
- ما می‌کنیم mâ mikonim 'we do'
- شما می‌کنید šomâ mikonid 'you do' - plural or formal
- ایشان می‌کنند išân mikonand 'they do'

The negative is made with the prefix نه ne-, which is stressed: من نمی‌کنم man nemikonam 'I don't do'.

In classical Persian the simple present is often found without the prefix mi-, but in modern Persian mi- is always added except in the verb dāštan 'to have', where it is usually omitted.

The simple present has various present meanings (general, habitual, progressive, performative); it can also have a future meaning (see below). Colloquially the simple present can also be used as a historical present when narrating events of the past, especially when relating events which occurred suddenly or unexpectedly.

Another meaning is the equivalent of an English perfect continuous in sentences such as:

- yek sā'at ast ke montazer-e to hastam 'I have been waiting for you for an hour' (lit. 'it is one hour that I am expecting you')

=== Simple present of 'to be' ===
The simple present of the verb بودن budan 'to be' is irregular in that it has no present stem. Instead it consists of enclitic words which cannot be used without a preceding noun or adjective. They are as follows:

- ام am 'I am'
- اى i 'you are'
- است ast 'he, she, it is' (colloquially pronounced e)
- ايم im 'we are'
- ايد id 'you are' (plural or formal)
- اند and 'they are' (or 'he/she is' - formal)

An example of the use of these is as follows:

- من دخترت ام؛ این برادرم است؛ تو پدرم ای

man doxtar-at am; in barâdar-am ast; to pedar-am i
'I am your daughter; this is my brother; you (sg.) are my father.'

There is also a second form of the simple present of 'to be' used to add emphasis, express existence and to avoid vowel combinations such as i-i, which despite being a present construction, has the endings of a past construction as follows:

- هستم hastam 'I am'
- ھستی hasti 'you are'
- ھست hast 'he/she/it is'
- ھستيم hastim 'we are'
- ھستيد hastid 'you are' (plural or formal)
- ھستند hastand 'they are' (or 'he/she is' - formal)

Yet another, but less commonly used, form of the verb 'to be' is mibāšam 'I am', etc., which has the normal present endings.

The negative of the verb 'to be' in modern Persian is nistam 'I am not', which has the same endings as hastam.

=== Present progressive ===
The imperfective aspect of the simple present can be further specified with progressive aspect by adding the simple present of داشتن dāštan 'to have' before the main verb. It is used in colloquial Persian only:

- من دارم می‌کنم man dāram mikonam 'I am doing (at this moment)'
- تو داری می‌کنی to dāri mikoni
- او دارد می‌کند u dārad mikonad
- ما داریم می‌کنیم mā dārim mikonim
- شما دارید می‌کنید šomā dārid mikonid
- آنها دارند می‌کنند ānhā dārand mikonand

The two halves of the verb are usually separated by other words, e.g. u dārad qazā mixorad 'he is eating at the moment'. There is no negative.

== Past constructions ==
=== Past simple ===
The past simple is formed with the infinitive stem and personal endings. There is no ending in the 3rd person singular:

- من کردم man kardam 'I did'
- تو کردی to kardi
- او کرد u kard
- ما کردیم mā kardim
- شما کردید šomā kardid
- آنها کردند ānhā kardand

The stress in this form goes on the syllable before the ending, e.g. kárdam, geréftam 'I took'. But in a compound verb, the stress goes on the word before the verb, e.g. on kār in kār kardam 'I worked'.

The negative is made with na- (stressed): man nákardam 'I didn't do (it)'.

In addition to its normal meaning of the simple past (e.g. 'he went'), the past simple also has some idiomatic uses in Persian. For example, colloquially it can be used in 'if' and 'when' clauses referring to future time:

- وقتی رسیدید لندن، فوراً به ما تلفن کنید.vaqt-i residid Landan, fowran be mā telefon konid 'when you reach London, phone us at once'
- تا تو برگردی، من نامه را نوشته ام tā to bargardi, man nāme-rā nevešte am 'by the time you come back I will have written the letter'

Another idiom is āmadam! 'I'm coming (at once!)'

The past simple construction in Persian is also often used where English might use the perfect to refer to events which have just occurred:

- havapeymā be zamin nešast 'the plane has just this moment landed'
- astaqferollāh! az dar vāred šod! 'talk of the devil! he's just come in the door!'

=== Imperfect ===
The imperfect is formed by prefixing می mi- to the simple past:

- من می‌کردم man mikardam 'I was doing, used to do, would do, would have done'
- تو می‌کردی to mikardi
- او می‌کرد u mikard
- ما می‌کردیم mā mikardim
- شما می‌کردید šomā mikardid
- آنها می‌کردند ānhā mikardand

The negative has ne-: man nemikardam 'I was not doing'.

The imperfect of بودن budan 'to be' and داشتن dāštan 'to have' do not use the prefix می mi-, except sometimes when the meaning is 'would be' or 'would have':

- من بودم man budam 'I was'
- من داشتم man dāštam 'I had'

The negative of these is made with na-: nabudam 'I was not'.

As well as its main past habitual or past progressive meaning ('I used to go', 'I was going'), the imperfect in Persian is also used in a conditional meaning ('I would go', 'I would have gone'), for example:

- agar ān-rā midāneštam, be šomā migoftam 'if I knew that, I would tell you' / 'if I had known that, I would have told you'

It can also be used in sentences expressing unfulfilled wishes concerning the present or the past:

- del-am mixāst miraftam 'I would love to have gone' / 'I would have loved to go' / 'I would love to be going'
- kāš u zende bud! 'I wish he were alive'
- dust dāštam jā-ye u mibudam! 'I would love to have been in his place'

=== Past progressive ===
In colloquial Persian the progressive aspect of the imperfect can be reinforced in its progressive meaning by adding the simple past of داشتن dāštan before it:

- من داشتم می‌کردم man dāštam mikardam 'I was doing (at that moment)'
- تو داشتی می‌کردی to dāšti mikardi
- او داشت می‌کرد u dāšt mikard
- ما داشتیم می‌کردیم mā dāštim mikardim
- شما داشتید می‌کردید šomā dāštid mikardid
- آنها داشتند می‌کردند ānhā dāštand mikardand

When used in a sentence, the two parts of the verb are usually separated by other words, e.g.

- داشتم فراموشت می‌کردم dāštam farāmuš-et mikardam 'I was beginning to forget you'

There is no negative.

=== Pluperfect ===
The pluperfect is a compound construction formed from the perfect participle and the simple past of the verb بودن (būdan), ‘to be’. As well as its ordinary use as a pluperfect, like the imperfect it can also be used in a conditional sense:

- من کرده بودم man karde budam 'I had done', 'I would have done'
- تو کرده بودی to karde budi
- او کرده بود u karde bud
- ما کرده بودیم mā karde budim
- شما کرده بودید šomā karde budid
- آنها کرده بودند ānhā karde budand

The negative is formed with na-: man nakarde budam 'I hadn't done'.

The verb budan 'to be' is not used in the pluperfect construction, the simple past being used instead.

Sometimes a continuous version of the pluperfect is found (man mikarde budam) but this is rare and not generally used; some Persian grammarians consider it ungrammatical.

As well as its ordinary pluperfect meaning ('he had gone'), the pluperfect can also be used instead of the imperfect in the sense 'would have gone' or 'if (only) he had gone':

- کاش تصادف نکرده بودم kāš tasādof nakarde budam! 'if only I hadn't had an accident!'
- اگر نیامده بود که آن اتفاق نمی‌افتاد agar nayāmade bud ke ān ettefāq nemioftād 'if he hadn't come, that incident wouldn't have happened!'

== Perfect constructions ==
Corresponding to each of the past constructions, Persian has a set of perfect constructions. These constructions are not only used in the ordinary perfect sense ('he has done X', 'he has sometimes done X') but also in colloquial Persian in an inferential or reported sense ('it appears that he did X').

=== Perfect simple ===
The perfect simple is formed by adding the present suffixes of the verb بودن budan ('to be') to the perfect participle:

- من کرده ام man karde am 'I have done'
- تو کرده ای to karde i
- او کرده است u karde ast (colloquially u karde, with ast omitted)
- ما کرده ایم mā karde im
- شما کرده اید šomā karde id
- آنها کرده اند ānhā karde and

The negative is made with na- (stressed): man nakarde am 'I have not done'.

The perfect construction is used in situations similar to those described for the perfect in English. One situation is the perfect of result:

- raside and 'they have arrived (and are still here)'
- man qalam-am-rā gom karde am 'I've lost my pen'

Another is the experiential perfect, to describe an event that has happened before (and may happen again):

- man se bār az Āmrikā didan karde am 'I have visited America three times'

Another use of the perfect is to describe a situation that has lasted a long time up to now:

- mā hamiše be qarb hasad borde im 'we have always been envious of the west'
- u tamām-e omr-eš injā zendegi karde ast 'he has lived here all his life'

Unlike the English perfect, the Persian perfect is compatible with a past-time adverbial. It is often used in sentences such as:

- in xāne dar sāl-e 1939 sāxte šode ast 'this house was built in 1939'
- Manučehr ketāb-rā diruz be u pas dade ast 'Manuchehr gave the book back to him yesterday'

Another use which differs from English is in sentences of the type 'it is a long time since X happened':

- faqat šeš māh ast ke az Englestān āmade 'it is just six months since he came from England'

With verbs meaning 'stand', 'sit', 'lie' the perfect can represent a present state:

- istāde ast 'he is standing'

=== Perfect continuous ===
The perfect continuous is made by adding the prefix mi- to the perfect:

- من می‌کرده‌ام man mikarde am 'I have been doing'; 'I used to do'

The negative (which is rare) is made with ne-: nemikarde am 'I have not been doing'.

This construction is not used in the same way in Persian as the English perfect continuous. As noted above, the present, not the perfect is used in sentences of the kind 'I have been waiting for an hour' (lit. 'it is an hour that I am waiting for you').

However, it can be used in sentences such as the following referring to events which have been happening repeatedly or continuously for a long time:

- gozašte-ye man hamiše marā ta'qib mikarde ast 'my past has always been following me'
- u sālhā dar in šahr zendegi mikarde 'he has lived in this city for years'

Another common use which differs from English is to express a situation that no longer exists, that is, it is the equivalent of 'I used to do':

- man ālmāni harf mizade am, ammā hālā farāmuš karde am 'I used to speak German, but now I have forgotten it'

It can also be used in an inferential sense, as in:

- az muy-e xis-eš peydā bud ke ābtani mikarde 'from his wet hair it was evident that he had been bathing'
- bačče-hā bāzi mikarde and ke sedā-ye šomā-rā našenide and '(it was no doubt) because the children were playing that they didn't hear you call'

=== Perfect progressive ===
A progressive version of the perfect continuous is also found in colloquial Persian, but it seems only in the 3rd person:

- او داشته ميکرده u dāšte mikarde 'apparently he was doing'

It is typically used in an inferential sense (that is, with the idea 'it would seem that...'), for example, in sentences in which the speaker is reporting something he has been told, but did not personally witness, such as the following:

- dāšte māšin midozdide, hesābi zadan-eš; panj ruz bimārestān bude '(apparently) he was (caught) stealing a car, they gave him a proper beating; (it seems) he was five days in hospital.'

=== Perfect pluperfect ===
A perfect version of the pluperfect (also known as the 'double perfect') can be made by changing budam in the pluperfect to bude am. This is occasionally used in a non-inferential sense, but much more frequently it is inferential:

- من کرده بوده ام man karde bude am 'I have sometimes been in the position of having done'; 'it seems that I had done'

A typical example of its use is the following:

- migoft komunist ast... čand-i piš se mah-i rafte bude Mesr 'he told me that he was a communist ... (it would seem that) some time previously he had gone to Egypt for about three months'

== Future constructions ==
The future construction is formed by adding a shortened version of the infinitive, identical with the infinitive stem, to the simple present form of the verb خواستن xāstan 'to want', but without the prefix mi-. It is rarely used in colloquial Persian, since the present constructions are usually used with a future meaning instead (especially with verbs of motion):

- خواهم کرد xāham kard 'I will do'
- خواهی کرد xāhi kard
- خواهد کرد xāhad kard
- خواهيم کرد xāhim kard
- خواهيد کرد xāhid kard
- خواهند کرد xāhand kard

The positive verb is stressed on the personal ending: xāhám kard. The negative is naxāham kard 'I will not do', with stress on ná-.

There is no distinction between simple and continuous in the future. There is also no future perfect. To represent the future perfect (e.g. 'I will have finished') Persian uses either the future simple or colloquially the perfect simple:

- tā jom'e tamām xāham kard 'I shall have finished by Friday'
- tā jom'e tamām karde am 'I shall have finished by Friday'

Another way of expressing future in colloquial Persian is to use a form meaning literally 'he wants to do it' in the sense 'he is about to do it', for example:

- havāpeymā mixād parvāz kone 'the plane is about to take off'
- havāpeymā mixāst parvāz kone 'the plane was about to take off'

There are also other expressions used for referring to the future, such as qarār ast 'it is arranged' or tasmim dāram 'I'm intending to', followed by the subjunctive:

- Ali qarār est fardā biyāyad 'Ali is to come tomorrow'
- man tasmim dāram sāl-e āyande yek āpārtmān bexaram 'I'm going to buy an apartment next year'

Present constructions also frequently used with future reference, but especially of verbs of motion or arriving. A time adverbial is also required to avoid ambiguity:

- barādar-am fardā be Širāz miravad 'my brother is going to Shiraz tomorrow'

== Other moods ==
=== Present subjunctive ===
The present subjunctive is formed by prefixing بـ be- to the present stem with personal endings, e.g. benevisam 'I may write'. When the verb has the vowel o this changes to bo-:

- بکنم bokonam 'that I do, I may do'
- بکنی bokoni
- بکند bokonad
- بکنیم bokonim
- بکنید bokonid
- بکنند bokonand

When used as part of a compound verb, the prefix be- is sometimes omitted, e.g. چکار کنم če kār konam? 'what am I to do?'

The negative also lacks the prefix be-: nakonam 'that I not do'.

The present subjunctive of the verb بودن 'to be' is باشم bāšam, with the same endings as above. The present subjunctive of the verb داشتن 'to have' is usually replaced by the perfect subjunctive داشته باشم dāšte bāšam.

The present subjunctive is very common in Persian. It is used whenever it is uncertain whether an event will take place, or whether a situation is true, e.g.

- شاید بروم šāyad beravam 'maybe I'll go'
- ممکن است که بيايد momken ast ke biyāyad 'it is possible that he will come'
- اگر بروم می دوم agar beravam, midavam 'if I go, I will run'
- اميد است که حالت خوب باشد omid ast ke hāl-et xub bāšad 'I hope you are well'

It is used for indefinite relative clauses such as the following:

- آيا کسی هست که فارسی بلد باشد؟ āyā kas-i hast ke fārsi balad bāšad? 'is there anyone who knows Persian?'

The subjunctive is also used after phrases such as qabl az inke 'before...' (of future or past time), tā 'until...' (of future time only), tā 'so that':

- قبل ازاينکه برويد، اين را امضا کنيد qabl az in ke beravid, in-rā emzā konid 'before you go, sign this'

It is also used instead of an infinitive after verbs such as 'I want', 'I can', 'I must', 'it is possible that', and in indirect commands:

- باید بروم bāyad beravam 'I must go'
- فرمود که حمله کنند farmud ke hamle konand 'he ordered them to attack'

=== Perfect subjunctive ===
The perfect subjunctive is formed by adding bāšam to the perfect participle. One of the main uses is in sentences referring to an event or state in the past about which there is an element of doubt:

- گمان می‌کنم رفته باشد gomān mikonam rafte bāšad 'I think he may have gone'
- او باید اشتباه کرده باشد u bāyad eštebāh karde bāšad 'he must have made a mistake'
- امیدوارم که دیر نکرده باشم omidvār-am ke dir nakarde bāšam 'I hope I'm not too late'
- می‌ترسم او رفته باشد mitarsam u rafte bāšad 'I'm afraid he may have gone'

It is also used for wishes:

- کاش رفته باشد kāš rafte bāšad! 'if only he were gone'

The negative is made with na-: nakarde bāšam 'that I have not done'.

=== Imperative ===
The imperative (command) is similar to the subjunctive, except that the 2nd person singular has no ending:

- بنويس benevis! 'write!'
- بنويسيد benevisid 'write!' (plural or formal)

The negative lacks the prefix be-: nanevis! 'do not write!'.

If the present stem ends in -av, as in rav 'go', this changes in the imperative singular to -o:

- برو boro! 'go!'

The imperative of the verb بودن 'to be' does not use the 'be-' prefix:

- باش bāš! 'be!'
- باشید bāšid 'be!' (plural or formal)

The imperative of the verb dāštan 'to have' generally uses the perfect subjunctive form:

- داشته باش dāšte bāš! 'have!'

=== Optative ===
Although it mostly appears in classical Persian literature, the optative mood is sometimes used in common Persian. It is formed by adding -ād to the present stem:

- کردن / کن kardan (kon-) 'to do' → Present Stem کن kon- → کناد konād ('may s/he do it!'). To negate it a prefix ma- is added: مکناد makonād ('may s/he not do that! we wish it will never happen') (= نکند nakonad in Modern Persian).

Although in general, this inflection has been abandoned, yet remnants of its usage can be observed in colloquial expressions such as harče bādā bād (هرچه بادا باد) 'come what may' and dast marizād (دست مريزاد) lit. 'may that hand not spill [what it is holding]', meaning 'well done'.

== Passive voice ==
Transitive verbs in Persian can be made passive by adding different tenses of the verb šodan 'to become' to the perfect participle, e.g. nāme nevešte (na)šode ast 'the letter has (not) been written' nāme nevešte xāhad šod 'the letter will be written'

In the subjunctive, the prefix be- is usually omitted: nāme bāyad nevešte šavad 'the letter must be written'

In compound verbs, the light verb kardan is simply replaced with šodan. For example, from čāp kardan 'to print' is made: āgahi diruz čāp šod 'the letter was printed yesterday'

== Intransitive, Transitive and Causative ==
Like English verbs, Persian verbs are either transitive (requiring an object) or intransitive. In Persian an accusative marker (enclitic), را rā, comes after any definite direct object:

- Intransitive: دویدم davidam = 'I ran'.
- Transitive: او را دیدم u-rā didam = 'I saw him'

An intransitive verb can be turned into a transitive one by making it into a causative verb. This is done by adding -ān- (in the past tense -ānd-) to the present stem of the verb. For example:

- Intransitive verb: خوابیدن xābidan (present stem: خواب xāb-) 'to sleep' → خوابیدم xābidam = 'I slept'.
- Causative form: خواباندن xābāndan 'to cause to sleep' → او را خواباندم u-rā xābāndam = 'I caused him to sleep' ≈ 'I put him to bed'.

There are also cases where a causative verb is formed from a transitive verb:

- Transitive verb خوردن xordan (خور xor-) (to eat) → Causative: خوراندن xorāndan ('to make eat') ≈ 'to feed'.

Causative verbs are not comprehensively productive, but are applied to certain verbs only.

== Colloquial pronunciation ==
In colloquial Persian, many of the most commonly used verbs are pronounced in an abbreviated form; and ān and ām may become un and um. Here are some examples:

- ast > e 'he is'
- mideham > midam 'I give'
- miravam > miram 'I go'
- mixānam > mixunam 'I read'
- miyāyam > miyām 'I come'
- āmadam > umadam 'I came'
- mišavam > mišam 'I become'
- mišavad > miše 'he becomes'
- mitavānam > mitunam 'I can'
- miguyad > mige 'he says'

== Compound verbs ==
Many verbs nowadays are compound verbs and many old simple verbs have been replaced by a compound. One of the most frequent verbs (known as light verbs) used to form compound verbs is کَردَن kardan 'to do, to make'. For example, the word صُحبَت sohbat means 'conversation', while صُحبَت کَردَن sohbat kardan means 'to speak'. Only the light verb (e.g. کَردَن kardan) is conjugated; the word preceding it is not affected. For example:

- صُحبَت می‌کُنَم sohbat mikonam 'I speak' or 'I am speaking' (as in the ability to speak a language)
- دارم صُحبَت می‌کُنَم dāram sohbat mikonam 'I am speaking'
- صُحبَت کَرده‌اَم sohbat karde am 'I have spoken'
- صُحبَت خواهَم کَرد sohbat xāham kard 'I will speak'

Some other light verbs used to form compound verbs are:

- دادن dādan ('to give') as in rox dādan 'to happen' (lit. 'to give face")
- گرفتن gereftan ('to take') as in yād gereftan 'to learn' (lit. 'to take memory')
- زدن zadan ('to hit') as in harf zadan 'to talk, to speak' (lit. 'to hit a letter')
- خوردن xordan ('to eat') as in zamin xordan 'to fall down' (lit. 'to eat the ground')
- شدن šodan ('to become') as in ārām šodan 'to calm down' (lit. "to become calm')
- داشتن dāštan ('to have') as in dust dāštan 'to love' (lit. 'to have a friend')

Some other examples of compound verbs with کَردَن kardan are:

- فِکر کَردَن fekr kardan 'to think'
- فَراموش کَردَن farāmuš kardan 'to forget'
- گِریه کَردَن gerye kardan 'to cry'
- تَعمیر کَردَن ta'mir kardan 'to repair'

Equivalents for فِکر کَردَن fekr kardan and گِریه کَردَن gerye kardan are پنداشتن pendāštan and گریستن geristan, which are normally used in a literary context rather than in daily conversation.

== Auxiliary Verbs ==
The following auxiliary verbs are used in Persian:

- بایَد bāyad - 'must': Not conjugated. Followed by a subjunctive.
- شایَد šāyad - 'might': Not conjugated. Followed by a subjunctive.
- تَوانِستَن tavānestan - 'can': Conjugated. Followed by a subjunctive.
- خواستَن xāstan - 'want': Conjugated. Followed by a subjunctive.
- خواهَم xāham - 'I will': Conjugated in the present simple. Followed by the short infinitive.

== Forms in indirect speech ==
In indirect sentences introduced by a past-tense verb (e.g. 'he said that...', 'he asked whether...', 'it was obvious that...'), if the second verb refers to a situation simultaneous with, or an event shortly to follow, the main verb, the present tense is used in Persian. It does not change to the past tense as in English:

- migoft (ke) komunist ast 'he said (that) he was a communist'

If the second verb refers to a time earlier than the first verb, it is common to use one of the perfect constructions for the second verb:

- ma'lum šod ke hads-am dorost bude ast va re'is-e farhang gofte bude... 'it became obvious that my guess had been correct and that the Director of Education had said...'

However the pluperfect can be used if the fact is certain:

- fahmidam ke rafte bud Ālmān 'I realised that he had been to Germany'

If the second verb merely represents an idea rather than a statement of fact, or a wish or a possibility, the subjunctive is used:

- heyf ast ke barf nabāšad 'it's a pity that there's no snow'
- omidvār-am ke zud biāyand 'I hope they come soon'

== Bibliography ==
- Boyle, John Andrew (1966). Grammar of Modern Persian. Harrassowitz, Wiesbaden.
- Comrie, Bernard (1976). Aspect. Cambridge University Press.
- Estaji, Azam; Bubenik, Vit (2007). "On the development of the tense/aspect system in Early New and New Persian". Diachronica 24, 1.
- Fallahi, Mohammad M. (1992). "Present Perfect Simple and Progressive Tenses in English and Persian: A Contrastive Analysis of Linguistic Systems" In The Third International Symposium on Language and Linguistics, Bangkok, Thailand, 747-755. Chulalongkorn University.
- Fallahi, Mohammad M. (1999). "Future tense systems in English and Persian: A Research in applied contrastive linguistics". Poznań Studies in Contemporary Linguistics 35, pp. 55–71.
- Johanson, Lars; Utas, Bo (eds) (2000). Evidentials: Turkic, Iranian, and Neighbouring Languages. Mouton de Gruyter.
- Khomeijani Farahani, Ali Akbar (1990). "A Syntactic and Semantic Study of the Tense and Aspect System of Modern Persian". PhD Thesis, University of Leeds.
- Lambton, Ann K.S. (1953). Persian Grammar. Cambridge University Press.
- Lazard, Gilbert (1985). "L'inférentiel ou passé distancié en persan", Studia Iranica 14/1, 27-42.
- Mace, John (2003). Persian Grammar: For Reference and Revision
- Rafiee, Abdi (1975). Colloquial Persian. Routledge.
- Simeonova, Vesela; Zareikar, Gita (2015). "The Syntax of Evidentials in Azeri, Bulgarian, and Persian". Proceedings of the 2015 annual conference of the Canadian Linguistic Association.
- Windfuhr, Gernot (1979). Persian Grammar: History and State of Its Study. De Gruyter.
- Windfuhr, Gernot (1980). Modern Persian: Intermediate level 1. University of Michigan Press.
- Yousef, Saeed; Torabi, Hayedeh (2012): Basic Persian: A Grammar and Workbook. Routledge.
- Yousef, Saeed; Torabi, Hayedeh (2013): Intermediate Persian: A Grammar and Workbook. Routledge.
