= UIMA =

Software and standard for data mining

UIMA (/juˈiːmə/ yoo-EE-mə), short for Unstructured Information Management Architecture, is an OASIS standard for content analytics, originally developed at IBM. It provides a component software architecture for the development, discovery, composition, and deployment of multi-modal analytics for the analysis of unstructured information and integration with search technologies.

== Structure ==
The UIMA architecture can be thought of in four dimensions:

1. It specifies component interfaces in an analytics pipeline.
2. It describes a set of design patterns.
3. It suggests two data representations: an in-memory representation of annotations for high-performance analytics and an XML representation of annotations for integration with remote web services.
4. It suggests development roles allowing tools to be used by users with diverse skills.

== Implementations and uses ==
Apache UIMA
- Developers: IBM, Apache Software Foundation (since October 2006)
- Stable release: 3.7.0 / October 8, 2026; 38 days ago
- Written in: Java with C++ enablement
- Operating system: cross-platform
- Type: text mining, information extraction
- License: Apache License 2.0
- Website: uima.apache.org
- Repository: svn.apache.org/repos/asf/uima/

Apache UIMA, a reference implementation of UIMA, is maintained by the Apache Software Foundation.

UIMA is used in a number of software projects:

- IBM Research's Watson uses UIMA for analyzing unstructured data.
- The Clinical Text Analysis and Knowledge Extraction System (Apache cTAKES) is a UIMA-based system for information extraction from medical records.
- DKPro Core is a collection of reusable UIMA components for general-purpose natural language processing.

== See also ==
- Data Discovery and Query Builder
- Entity extraction
- General Architecture for Text Engineering (GATE)
- IBM Omnifind
- LanguageWare
