= Joan Bresnan =

American linguist (born 1945)

- Born: August 22, 1945 (age 80)
- Education: Reed College (B.A.); Massachusetts Institute of Technology (Ph.D.)
- Occupations: Linguist; academic; professor
- Known for: Lexical functional grammar
- Scientific career
- Doctoral students: Lori Levin

Joan Wanda Bresnan FBA (born August 22, 1945) is an American linguist and the Sadie Dernham Patek Professor in Humanities Emerita at Stanford University. She is best known as one of the architects (with Ronald Kaplan) of the theoretical framework of lexical functional grammar.

== Career and research ==
After graduating from Reed College in 1966 with a degree in philosophy, Bresnan earned her doctorate in linguistics in 1972 at the Massachusetts Institute of Technology, where she studied with Noam Chomsky. In the early and mid 1970s, her work focused on complementation and wh-movement constructions within transformational grammar, and she frequently took positions at odds with those espoused by Chomsky.

Her dissatisfaction with transformational grammar led her to collaborate with Kaplan on a new theoretical framework, lexical-functional grammar, or LFG. A volume of papers written in the new framework and edited by Bresnan, entitled The Mental Representation of Grammatical Relations, appeared in 1982. Since then, Bresnan's work has focused on LFG analyses of various phenomena, primarily in English, Bantu languages, and Australian languages. She has also worked on analyses in optimality theory, and has pursued statistical approaches to linguistics. She has a strong interest in linguistic typology, which has influenced the development of LFG. Additional research interests of hers include dynamics of probabilistic grammar and empirical foundations of syntax. In pursuit of the latter, she established Stanford's Spoken Syntax Lab.

== Honors ==
Joan Bresnan was a Guggenheim Fellow in 1975-6 and a Fellow of the Center for Advanced Study in the Behavioral Sciences at Stanford in 1982-3.

She served as the president of the Linguistic Society of America in 1999. She was named a Fellow of the Linguistic Society of America in 2006.

She was elected a Fellow of the American Academy of Arts and Sciences in 2004.

She was honored in August 2005 with a Festschrift entitled Architectures, Rules, and Preferences: A Festschrift for Joan Bresnan, published by CSLI Publications in December 2007.

During periods in 2009-2012 she visited Freiburg for collaborative research as an External Fellow at the Freiburg Institute for Advanced Studies. She was elected a Fellow of the Cognitive Science Society in 2012. She was elected as a Corresponding Fellow of the British Academy in 2015.

In 2016, she was selected as the Association for Computational Linguistics Lifetime Achievement Award winner.

In 2023, she was elected to the National Academy of Sciences.

== Teaching ==
Bresnan has also taught at the University of Massachusetts Amherst and the Massachusetts Institute of Technology as a member of the faculty.

== Selected publications ==
Bresnan wrote an informal and somewhat humorous account of her career and works for her ACL Lifetime Achievement Award.

As of December 16, 2018, Stanford lists forty-four books and papers that Bresnan has either authored or co-authored since 1996. However, she has been publishing since well over a decade before that. An incomplete selection of her particularly influential works appears below.

- 1982 Kaplan, Ronald and Joan Bresnan, "Lexical-Functional Grammar: A Formal System for Grammatical Representation," in J. Bresnan, ed., The Mental Representation of Grammatical Relations, Chapter 4, The MIT Press (1982) (pp. 173–281).
- 1987 Bresnan, Joan and Sam A. Mchombo, "Topic, Pronoun, and Agreement in Chichewa," Language LXIII.4 (December 1987) (pp. 741–782)
- 1996 Austin, Peter and Joan Bresnan, "Nonconfigurationality in Australian Aboriginal Languages," Natural Language and Linguistic Theory. 14 (pp. 215–268)
- 2001 Bresnan, Joan, Shipra, Dingare, and Christopher D. Manning. "Soft Constraints Mirror Hard Constraints: Voice and Person in English and Lummi," in proceedings of the LFG '01 Conference, University of Hong Kong. On-line, CSLI Publications: http://csli-publications.stanford.edu/LFG/6/lfg01.html.
- 2007 Bresnan, Joan, Anna Cueni, Tatiana Nikitina, and R. Harald Baayen. "Predicting the Dative Alternation." In Cognitive Foundations of Interpretation, ed. by G. Bouma, I. Kraemer and J. Zwarts. Royal Netherlands Academy of Science, Amsterdam, pp. 69–94.
- 2007 "Is Syntactic Knowledge Probabilistic? Experiments with the English Dative Alternation." In Roots: Linguistics in search of its evidential base, Series: Studies in Generative Grammar, ed. by Sam Featherston and Wolfgang Sternefeld. Berlin and New York: Mouton de Gruyter, pp. 75–96.

Preceded by Li Sheng	ACL Lifetime Achievement Award; 2016	Succeeded by Barbara J. Grosz
