= Li Sheng =

Li Sheng may refer to:

- Li Sheng (Three Kingdoms) (李勝: ? - 249), Cao Wei official
- Li Sheng (Tang dynasty) (李晟: 727-793), Tang dynasty general
- Li Sheng (artist) (fl. 1346), Chinese landscape artist
- Li Sheng (computer scientist) (李生; born 1943)
