= Zhou Ming =

Zhou Ming may refer to:

- Zhou Ming (athlete) (born 1970), Chinese long jump athlete
- Zhou Ming (linguist), Chinese linguist, computer scientist, and technology executive
