= Raymond Perrault =

Raymond Perrault may refer to:

- Ray Perrault (1926–2008), Canadian politician
- C. Raymond Perrault, director of the Artificial Intelligence Center at SRI International
