= Li Sheng (computer scientist) =

Chinese computer scientists (born 1943)

- Born: 1943 (age 82–83); Heilongjiang
- Education: computer specialty of HIT

Li Sheng (Chinese: 李生; born 1943), is a professor at the School of Computer Science and Engineering, Harbin Institute of Technology (HIT), China. He began his research on Chinese-English machine translation in 1985, making himself one of the earliest Chinese scholars in this field. After that, he pursued in vast topics of natural language processing, including machine translation, information retrieval, question answering and applied artificial intelligence. He was the final review committee member for computer area in NSF China.

Born and raised in Heilongjiang province, he graduated in 1965 from the computer specialty of HIT, which is one of the earliest computer specialties in Chinese universities. Then he started to work as a staff in the Computer specialty of HIT, which was finally granted as a department in 1985. Also from 1985, he was appointed to undertake a series administrative positions in HIT, e.g. Dean of Computer Department(1987–1988), Director of R&D Division (1988–1990), Chief R&D Officer and several other key leading positions in HIT.

Resigned all his administrative positions in 2004, Li devoted himself as the director of MOE-Microsoft Join Key Lab of NLP& Speech (HIT), making it a leading NLP research group with more than 100 staffs and students working on various aspects of NLP. So far, the lab has already been granted for dozens of technology awards by the ministries of central government and local provincial government of China. Its research progresses are reported annually in top tier conferences including ACL, IJCAI, SIGIR etc.

As one of the pioneers in NLP research in China, he contributes NLP in China not only in technology innovations but also in talents education. So far, his research group has graduated more than 60 Ph.D. and almost 200 M.E with NLP major. Most of them are now working as the chief researcher in various NLP groups of universities and companies in China, including several world-known NLP scholars, such as Wang Haifeng of Baidu, Zhou Ming of Microsoft Research, Zhang Min (张民) of Soochow University (China), and Zhao Tiejun (赵铁军) and Liu Ting (刘挺) of HIT.

Owing to his contributions in Chinese language processing, Li was elected as the President of Chinese Information Processing Society of China (CIPSC) in 2011. He scaled this top level academic organization in China up to more than 3000 registered members, and promoted NLP into several national projects for research or industry development. In addition, the CIPSC is now enhancing its co-operations with world NLP organizations including ACL.

== Machine Intelligence & Translation Laboratory (MI&TLAB) ==
Originates from Machine Translation Research Group of Computer Science Department, Harbin Institute of Technology, which was started Li in 1985. It is one of the earliest institutions engaged in MT research in China, featured by its investigations into Chinese-English machine translation. It is now running under the Research Center on Language Technology, School of Computer Science and Technology, HIT.

Details for staffs and publications can be found at https://mitlab.hit.edu.cn.

== MOE-MS Joint Key Lab of Natural Language Processing and Speech (HIT) ==
In June, 2000, the Joint HIT-Microsoft Machine Translation Lab was founded by MI&T Lab and Microsoft Research (China). It was the third joint lab established by Microsoft Research (China) with Chinese universities, and the only one focusing on Machine Translation. Based on this jointly lab, the cooperation between HIT and Microsoft gradually extended to the areas of machine translation, information retrieval, speech recognition and processing, natural language understanding. In Oct, 2004, the joint key lab was granted as one of the 10 joint key labs supported by the Microsoft Research of Asia and Ministry of Education in China. In July 2006, the Shenzhen extension of the lab was launched. More than 200 staff and students have undertaken research projects, including some sponsored by the National Natural Science Foundation of China and the National 863 program of China. Since 2005, the lab has also been organizing a summer camp in Harbin Institute of Technology, and approximately 150 faculty members and students from universities in China have participated. This summer workshop was organized annually until 2014, when it was organized formally as the summer school series by Chinese Information Processing Society, China. Through the lab, a Microsoft Research of Asia-HIT joint PhD program was implemented in 2012.

== CEMT-I MT System ==
In May 1989, CEMT-I passed the formal project appraisal in Harbin, China. Capable of translating technical paper titles from Chinese to English, it is not only the first MT system completed by Li and his group, but also the first Chinese-English Translation system that passed the technical appraisal by Chinese government according to the public reports. It was then awarded the Second Prize of Ministry Level Technology Innovation by the former National Aerospace Industry Corporation in 1990.

== Daya Translation Workstation ==
Owing to the technical achievements by Li's group in Chinese-English machine translation, the former National Aerospace Industry Corporation of China sponsored a commercial system development of "Daya Translation Station (MT)" in 1993. Designed as a comprehensive English composition aid for Chinese users, this system was finished and put into the market in 1995. And in 1997, this system was awarded the Second Prize of Ministry Level Technology Innovation by the former National Aerospace Industry Corporation.

== BT863 MT System ==
From 1994, the researches in Li's lab were supported by National 863 Hi-tech Research and Development Program. During this period, the BT863 system was explored to employ one engine for both Chinese-English and English-Chinese translation. This system was proved to be the best performance among Chinese-English MT systems in the formal technical evaluation of National 863 program, yielding the Third Prize of Ministry Level Technology Innovation by the former National Aerospace Industry Corporation in 1997.

== Next Generation IR ==
This is a key project granted by NSF China (with a joint sponsorship from MSRA) started form 2008. In contrast to his previous NSF grants for different NLP issues, Li explored in his last PI project on key technologies in personalized IR, together with researchers from Tsinghua University and Institute of Software, Chinese Academy of Science. With impressive publications in top tier journals and conferences (including breakthrough publications in SIGIR of his own group), this projected was approved "A-level" achievements by the NSF China office in 2012.

Preceded by Robert Mercer	ACL Lifetime Achievement Award; 2015	Succeeded by Joan Bresnan
