= Iryna Gurevych =

German computer scientist

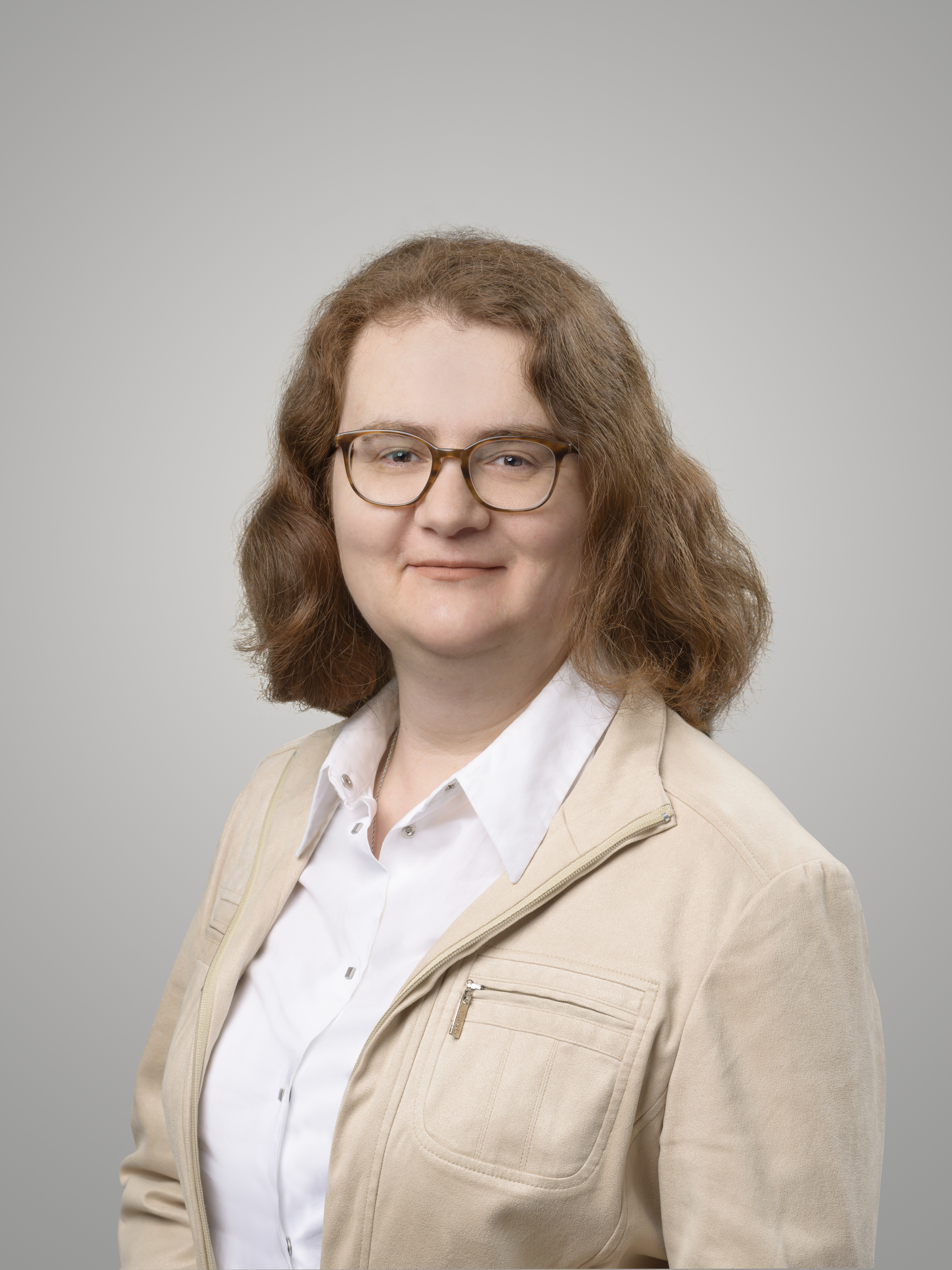
Gurevych in 2019

Iryna Gurevych (born 16 March 1976, in Vinnytsia, Ukraine) is a German computer scientist. She is professor at the Department of Computer Science of the Technical University of Darmstadt and director of the Ubiquitous Knowledge Processing Lab (UKP Lab). Her research focuses on Natural language processing and Machine learning. She served as President of the Association for Computational Linguistics in 2023 and is a member of the German National Academy of Sciences Leopoldina and the Academia Europaea.

== Life ==
Gurevych received her diploma in English and German Linguistics from the Vinnytsia State Pedagogical University in 1998. In 2001, she received her Ph.D. in Computational Linguistics from University of Duisburg-Essen.

From 2001 to 2005, she worked as a postdoctoral researcher at the European Media Lab and EML Research. From 2005 to 2007, she was a senior researcher in the research area of E-learning at the Technical University of Darmstadt. As head of an Emmy Noether Research Group funded by the German Research Foundation, Gurevych founded the research group "Ubiquitous Knowledge Processing" (UKP Lab) and was awarded a Lichtenberg Professorship of the Volkswagen Foundation in 2008. Since 2009 she holds the W3 professorship "Ubiquitous Knowledge Processing".

From 2014 to 2019, she was co-director of the Centre for the Digital Foundation of Research in the Humanities, Social, and Educational Sciences (CEDIFOR), which was funded by the Federal Ministry of Education and Research. The following year, she founded the research training group AIPHES (Adaptive Information Preparation from Heterogeneous Sources), which ran until 2019, funded by the German Research Foundation. From 2020 to 2021, Gurevych also directed CA-SG, a research initiative "Content Analytics for the Social Good" of the Rhine-Main Universities and was appointed co-director of the Natural Language Processing (NLP) program of ELLIS, a European Network of Excellence in Machine Learning.

In 2020, Gurevych was awarded as a Fellow of the international scientific Association for Computational Linguistics (ACL) for her outstanding contributions in the field of Natural Language Processing and Machine Learning. On 1 January 2021, Gurevych took over the office of Vice-president-elect of the Association for Computational Linguistics (ACL); in 2023 she became its President and she is now its former president.

Gurevych received the first LOEWE professorship of the LOEWE programme, a Hessian research funding programme in Germany, in March 2021. She has been an Adjunct Professor at the Natural Language Processing Department of the Mohamed bin Zayed University of Artificial Intelligence (MBZUAI) in Abu Dhabi since December 2022, and an Affiliated Professor at the Institute for Computer Science, Artificial Intelligence and Technology (INSAIT) in Sofia, Bulgaria, since February 2024.

== Research ==
Gurevych's research spans a wide range of topics from Generative AI and Large Language Models to AI Safety, AI for Science, and NLP for Mental Health. With Nils Reimers, she developed Sentence-BERT (SBERT), a modification of the BERT architecture that uses siamese and triplet network structures to produce sentence embeddings that can be compared efficiently using cosine similarity. Her group also co-developed AdapterHub, a framework for adapter-based transfer learning with pre-trained transformer models, and AdapterFusion, a method for combining knowledge from multiple task-specific adapters.

== Awards ==
- Member of the Academia Europaea, since 2025
- Royal Society Milner Award and Lecture, 2025, for her research on artificial intelligence
- First recipient of the ATHENE Distinguished Professorship, National Research Center for Applied Cybersecurity, 2025
- Member of the National Academy of Sciences Leopoldina, since 2024
- Member of the Berlin-Brandenburg Academy of Sciences and Humanities (BBAW), since 2022
- First LOEWE-professorship in Hesse, Germany, 2021
- Association for Computational Linguistics (ACL) Fellowship, 2020
- Unstructured Information Analytics 2008 Innovation Award from IBM "DKPro-ML: An Open Source UIMA based Framework for Machine Learning", 2008
- Unstructured Information Analytics 2008 Innovation Award from IBM "UIMA-based Fundamental Course for Teaching Emerging NLP Trends to Computer Science Students", 2008
- UniTechSpin Special Award from Isra Vision "Semantic Information Management for Business Processes", 2008
- Lichtenberg-Professorship Award from the Volkswagen Foundation, 2008
- Emmy-Noether Researcher's Excellence Career Award, German Research Foundation, 2007

== Publications ==
- N. Thakur, N. Reimers, A. Rücklé, A. Srivastava, and I. Gurevych, BEIR: A Heterogeneous Benchmark for Zero-shot Evaluation of Information Retrieval Models, Thirty-fifth Conference on Neural Information Processing Systems (NeurIPS), Datasets and Benchmarks Track, 2021.
- J. Pfeiffer, A. Kamath, A. Rücklé, K. Cho, and I. Gurevych, AdapterFusion: Non-Destructive Task Composition for Transfer Learning, Proceedings of the 16th Conference of the European Chapter of the Association for Computational Linguistics (EACL), pp. 487–503, 2021.
- J. Pfeiffer, A. Rücklé, C. Poth, A. Kamath, I. Vulić, S. Ruder, K. Cho, and I. Gurevych, AdapterHub: A Framework for Adapting Transformers, Proceedings of the 2020 Conference on Empirical Methods in Natural Language Processing: System Demonstrations, pp. 46–54, 2020.
- L. F. R. Ribeiro, Y. Zhang, C. Gardent, and I. Gurevych, Modeling global and local node contexts for text generation from knowledge graphs, Transactions of the Association for Computational Linguistics, pp. 589–604, 2020.
- E. Simpson, Y. Gao, and I. Gurevych, Interactive text ranking with bayesian optimisation: A case study on community qa and summarisation, Transactions of the Association for Computational Linguistics, pp. 759–775, 2020.
- E. Simpson and I. Gurevych, Scalable bayesian preference learning for crowds, Machine Learning, vol. 109, pp. 689–718, 2020.
- N. Reimers and I. Gurevych, Sentence-BERT: Sentence Embeddings using Siamese BERT-Networks, Proceedings of the 2019 Conference on Empirical Methods in Natural Language Processing and the 9th International Joint Conference on Natural Language Processing (EMNLP-IJCNLP), pp. 3982–3992, 2019.
- Y. Gao, C. M. Meyer, and I. Gurevych, Preference-based interactive multi-document summarisation, Information Retrieval Journal: Special Issue on Learning from User Interaction, pp. 1–31, 2019.
- I. Gurevych, J. Eckle-Kohler, and M. Matuschek, Linked Lexical Knowledge Bases: Foundations and Applications. Ser. Synthesis Lectures on Human Language Technologies. Morgan & Claypool Publishers, 2016.
