= Joyce Friedman =

American mathematician and computational linguist

Joyce Barbara Friedman (1928 – November 28, 2018) was an American mathematician, operations researcher, computer scientist, and computational linguist who worked as a professor at the University of Michigan and Boston University and served as president of the Association for Computational Linguistics.

== Early life and education ==
Friedman was born in 1928. She was a Durant Scholar at Wellesley College, from which she graduated in 1949, and earned a master's degree at Radcliffe College in 1952. In the same year she moved from the Logistics Research Project at George Washington University to the US Department of Defense, later working at a succession of defense contractors: ACF Industries (where she worked with Sheldon Akers on production scheduling), Tech. Operations, Inc., and the Mitre Corporation.

Returning to graduate study at Harvard University, her interests shifted from operations research to automated reasoning. She completed her Ph.D. in 1965, supervised by Hao Wang, with the dissertation A New Decision Procedure in Logic with a Computer Realization, concerning computational methods in first-order logic.

== Academic career and later life ==
Friedman worked as an assistant professor at Stanford University from 1965 until 1968, when she moved to the University of Michigan as an associate professor of computer and communications sciences. At Michigan, she was promoted to full professor in 1971. She moved to Boston University as chair of computer science in 1983.

Even before completing her doctorate, Friedman had worked at Mitre as a programmer for Donald E. Walker on a project for the US Air Force involving the development of programs that could answer English-language questions. As an academic, her research largely concentrated on computational linguistics and formal grammars; she served as president of the Association for Computational Linguistics in 1971. Some of her work on transformational grammar was described in her 1971 book, A Computational Model of Transformational Grammar. She has over 180 academic descendants through three of her doctoral students: C. Raymond Perrault, Remko Scha, and David S. Warren.

She died on November 28, 2018, in Cambridge, Massachusetts.

== Recognition ==
Friedman was named a Fellow of the American Association for the Advancement of Science in 1986.
