= UKP =

UKP may refer to:

- Ukrainian Communist Party
- Pound sterling (non-standard code)
- Unbounded knapsack problem, a problem in combinatorial optimization
- Ubiquitous Knowledge Processing Lab (UKP Lab), at the Technische Universität Darmstadt
