= AUTINDEX =

Software package

AUTINDEX is a commercial text mining software package based on sophisticated linguistics.

AUTINDEX, resulting from research in information extraction, is a product of the Institute of Applied Information Sciences (IAI) which is a non-profit institute that has been researching and developing language technology since its foundation in 1985. IAI is an institute affiliated to Saarland University in Saarbrücken, Germany.

AUTINDEX is the result of a number of research projects funded by the EU (Project BINDEX), by Deutsche Forschungsgemeinschaft and the German Ministry for Economy. Amongst the latter there are the projects LinSearch, and WISSMER, see also the reference to IAI-Website.

The basic functionality of AUTINDEX is the extraction of key words from a document to represent the semantics of the document. Ideally the system is integrated with a thesaurus that defines the standardised terms to be used for key word assignment.
AUTINDEX is used in library applications (e.g. integrated in dandelon.com) as well as in high quality (expert) information systems, and in document management and content management environments.

Together with AUTINDEX a number of additional software comes along such as an integration with Apache Solr / Lucene to provide a complete information retrieval environment, a classification and categorisation system on the basis of a machine learning software that assigns domains to the document, and a system for searching with semantically similar terms that are collected in so called tag clouds.

== See also ==
- Information retrieval
- Linguistics
- Knowledge Management
- Natural Language Processing
- Semantics

== Publications ==
- Ripplinger, Bärbel 2001: Das Indexierungssystem AUTINDEX, in GLDV Tagung, Giessen.
- Paul Schmidt, Thomas Bähr & Dr.-Ing. Jens Biesterfeld &Thomas Risse & Kerstin Denecke & Claudiu Firan, 2008: LINSearch. Aufbereitung von Fachwissen für die gezielte Informationsversorgung. In: Proceedings of Knowtech, Frankfurt.
- Paul Schmidt, Mahmoud Gindiyeh, Gintare Grigonyte: Language Technology for Information Systems. In: Proceedings of KDIR – The International Joint Conference on Knowledge Discovery, Knowledge Engineering and Knowledge Management Madeira. 6.–8. Oktober 2009, Portugal. 2009, S. 259 - 262.
- Paul Schmidt, Mahmoud Gindiyeh: Language Technology for Multilingual Information and Document Management. In: Proceedings of ASLIB. London, 19.–20. November 2009.
- Rösener, Christoph, Ulrich Herb: Automatische Schlagwortvergabe aus der SWD für Repositorien. Zusammen mit Ulrich Herb in Proceedings. Berufsverband Information Bibliothek, Bibliothekartage. 97. Deutscher Bibliothekartag, Mannheim, 2008.
- Svenja Siedle: Suchst du noch oder weißt du schon? Inhaltserschließung leicht gemacht mit automatischer Indexierung. In: tekom-Jahrestagung und tcworld conference 2013
- Michael Gerards, Adreas Gerards, Peter Weiland: Der Einsatz der automatischen Indexierungssoftware AUTINDEX im Zentrum für Psychologische Information und Dokumentation (ZPID). 2006 (Online bei zpid.de, PDF-Datei)
- Mahmoud Gindiyeh: Anwendung wahrscheinlichkeitstheoretischer Methoden in der linguistischen Informationsverarbeitung. Logos Verlag, Berlin, 2013.
