= Gardent =

Gardent is a French surname. Notable people with the name include:

- Claire Gardent, French computer scientist and linguist
- Philippe Gardent (handballer) (born 1964), French handball player
- Philippe Gardent (rugby league) (born 1979), French rugby league player and former American football player
