= Dilek Hakkani-Tür =

Turkish-American computer scientist

Dilek Z. Hakkani-Tür is a Turkish-American computer scientist focusing on speech processing, speech recognition, and dialogue systems. She is a professor of computer science at the University of Illinois Urbana-Champaign.

== Education and career ==
Hakkani-Tür is a 1994 graduate of Middle East Technical University in Ankara, Turkey. She continued her studies at Bilkent University, also in Ankara, where she earned a master's degree in 1996 and completed her Ph.D. in 2000.

She worked as a researcher at AT&T Labs from 2001 to 2005, at the International Computer Science Institute from 2006 to 2010, at Microsoft Research from 2010 to 2016, at Google Research from 2016 to 2018, and at Amazon Alexa from 2018 to 2023. At Microsoft, she was in the team of scientists that built the first prototype of the Cortana virtual assistant. While working for Amazon Alexa, she also taught at the University of California, Santa Cruz as a distinguished visiting instructor. She joined the University of Illinois Urbana-Champaign faculty in 2023.

She was editor-in-chief of IEEE/ACM Transactions on Audio, Speech and Language Processing from 2019 to 2021, and is president of the Special Interest Group on Discourse and Dialogue of the Association for Computational Linguistics for the 2023–2025 term. She has served as co-editor-in-chief of Transactions of the Association for Computational Linguistics since 2024.

== Recognition ==
In 2014, Hakkani-Tür was elected as an IEEE Fellow "for contributions to spoken language processing", and as a Fellow of the International Speech Communication Association "for contributions to advancing the state-of-the-art in spoken language processing, especially for human/human and human/machine conversational understanding". In 2024, she was elected as a Fellow of the Association for Computational Linguistics for her contributions to spoken dialogue systems.
