= Toni Martí =

Toni Martí may refer to:

- Antoni Martí (1963–2023), Andorran architect and politician
- Maria Antònia Martí, Spanish Catalan linguist
