= Empirical Methods in Natural Language Processing =

Computer science conference (1996–present)

- Abbreviation: EMNLP
- Discipline: Natural language processing, Machine learning, artificial intelligence

Publication details
- History: 1996–present
- Frequency: Annual
- Open access: yes
- Website: 2026.emnlp.org

Empirical Methods in Natural Language Processing (EMNLP) is a leading conference in the area of natural language processing and artificial intelligence. Along with the Association for Computational Linguistics (ACL) and the North American Chapter of the Association for Computational Linguistics (NAACL), it is one of the three primary high impact conferences for natural language processing research. EMNLP is organized by the ACL special interest group on linguistic data (SIGDAT) and was started in 1996, based on an earlier conference series called Workshop on Very Large Corpora (WVLC).

As of 2021, according to Microsoft Academic, EMNLP is the 14th most cited conference in computer science, with a citation count of 332,738, between ICML (#13) and ICLR (#15).

== Locations ==
- EMNLP 2026, Budapest, Hungary
- EMNLP 2025, Suzhou, China
- EMNLP 2024, Miami, Florida, United States
- EMNLP 2023, Singapore
- EMNLP 2022, Abu Dhabi, United Arab Emirates (Hybrid)
- EMNLP 2021, Punta Cana, Dominican Republic or online
- EMNLP 2020, Punta Cana, Dominican Republic (Virtual conference due to COVID-19)
- EMNLP-IJCNLP 2019, Hong Kong, China
- EMNLP 2018, Brussels, Belgium
- EMNLP 2017, Copenhagen, Denmark
- EMNLP 2016, Austin, Texas, United States
- EMNLP 2015, Lisbon, Portugal
- EMNLP 2014, Doha, Qatar
- EMNLP 2013, Seattle, Washington, United States
- EMNLP 2012, Jeju Island, South Korea
- EMNLP 2011, Edinburgh, United Kingdom
- EMNLP 2010, Cambridge, Massachusetts, United States
- EMNLP 2009, Singapore
- EMNLP 2008, Honolulu, Hawaii, United States
- EMNLP 2007, Prague, Czech Republic
- EMNLP 2006, Sydney, Australia
- HLT/EMNLP 2005, Vancouver, British Columbia, Canada
- EMNLP 2004, Barcelona, Spain
- EMNLP 2003, Sapporo, Japan
- EMNLP 2002, Philadelphia, Pennsylvania, United States
- EMNLP 2001, Pittsburgh, Pennsylvania, United States
- EMNLP/VLC 2000, Hong Kong, China
- EMNLP/VLC 1999, College Park, Maryland, United States
- EMNLP 1998, Granada, Spain
- EMNLP 1997, Providence, Rhode Island, United States
- EMNLP 1996, Philadelphia, Pennsylvania, United States
