= Aslı Çelikyılmaz =

Computer scientist

Aslı Çelikyılmaz is an engineer specializing in natural language processing, and particularly in natural language generation for software agents with advanced reasoning and real-world modeling capabilities. Educated in Turkey and Canada, she works in the US as senior research lead at Fundamentals AI Research, Meta. She also holds an affiliate faculty position in computer science at the University of Washington, and is co-editor-in-chief of the journal Transactions of the Association for Computational Linguistics.

== Education and career ==
Çelikyılmaz is a 1997 graduate of Istanbul Technical University, where she studied industrial engineering. After a 2002 master's degree in computer and information science from Seneca Polytechnic in Toronto, and a second master's degree in information science from the University of Toronto in 2005, she completed a Ph.D. in information science at the University of Toronto in 2008.

She worked as a postdoctoral researcher in California, at the University of California, Berkeley, from 2008 to 2010. In 2010 she joined Microsoft in Sunnyvale, California, where she became a senior scientist and later a senior principal researcher in Redmond, Washington. She added her affiliation with the University of Washington in 2018, and moved to Meta in Seattle in 2021.

== Recognition ==
Çelikyılmaz was named to the 2026 class of IEEE Fellows, "for contributions to conversational systems and language generation".
