= Bonnie Dorr =

American computer scientist

- Education: Boston University; MIT
- Scientific career
- Workplaces: University of Florida, Gainesville; Florida Institute for Human and Machine Cognition; University of Maryland, College Park

Bonnie Jean Dorr is an American computer scientist specializing in natural language processing, machine translation, automatic summarization, social computing, and explainable artificial intelligence. She is a professor and director of the Natural Language Processing Research Laboratory in the Department of Computer & Information Science & Engineering at the University of Florida. Gainesville, Florida She is professor emerita of computer science and linguistics and former dean at the University of Maryland, College Park, former associate director at the Florida Institute for Human and Machine Cognition,, and former president of the Association for Computational Linguistics.

== Education ==
Dorr is a graduate of Boston University, and earned both a Master's (1986) and a Ph.D. (1990) from the Massachusetts Institute of Technology. Her dissertation, Lexical Conceptual Structure and Machine Translation, was supervised by Robert C. Berwick.

== Academic career ==
Dorr joined the University of Maryland faculty in 1992. At Maryland, she became the founding co-director of the Computational Linguistics and Information Processing Laboratory, and associate dean of the university's College of Computer, Math, and Natural Sciences (formerly College of Computer, Math, and Physical Sciences). She has also worked as a program director at DARPA beginning in 2011 while on leave from Maryland.

She joined the Florida Institute for Human and Machine Cognition in 2014. In January 2022, she joined the University of Florida as a professor, where she founded and now serves as director of the Natural Language Processing Research Laboratory.

== Book ==
Dorr is the author of Machine Translation: A View from the Lexicon (MIT Press, 1993), a revision of her doctoral dissertation. It describes an approach to interlingual machine translation in which, rather than directly translating text from one language to another, it goes through an intermediate form represented using conceptual semantics. The translations between the syntax of each natural language handled by the system and this form are made using government and binding theory, in contrast to the more typical approach from that time which performed this sort of translation using phrase structure grammars and the unification of feature structures. Her system was embodied in the UNITRAN system, and translated between English, Spanish, and German. However, her work was criticized for its lack of completeness (inability to handle certain common grammatical structures in these languages).

Subsequently to Dorr's work, rule-based machine translation systems such as hers have largely been supplanted by statistical machine translation and neural machine translation, and some of Dorr's own later work instead focuses on data-driven approaches to machine translation and prioritization of explainability in the face of the recent push for large language models (e.g., ChatGPT).

== Recognition ==
Dorr was president of the Association for Computational Linguistics for 2008. She has been a Sloan Research Fellow and National Science Foundation Presidential Faculty Fellow. She was elected as a Fellow of the Association for the Advancement of Artificial Intelligence in 2013 for "significant contributions to natural language understanding and representation, and development of the widely recognized methods for interlingual machine translation". In 2016 she was elected as a Fellow of the Association for Computational Linguistics and in 2021 she was elected Fellow of the Association for Computing Machinery.
