= James F. Allen (computer scientist) =

American computer scientist and linguist (born 1950)

James Frederick Allen
- Born: 1950 (age 75–76)
- Education: University of Toronto (Ph.D., 1979)
- Known for: TRIPS (An Integrated Intelligent Problem-Solving Assistant); PLOW (A Collaborative Task Learning Agent)
- Awards: AAAI Fellow (1990, Founding)
- Scientific career
- Fields: Artificial Intelligence; Natural Language Processing & Understanding; Computational Linguistics
- Workplaces: University of Rochester; IHMC
- Thesis: A plan-based approach to speech act recognition (1979)
- Academic advisors: C. Raymond Perrault
- Notable students: Garrison Cottrell; Henry Kautz; Diane Litman
- Website: www.cs.rochester.edu/~james/

James Frederick Allen (born 1950) is an American computational linguist recognized for his contributions to temporal logic, in particular Allen's interval algebra. He is interested in knowledge representation, commonsense reasoning, and natural language understanding, believing that "deep language understanding can only currently be achieved by significant hand-engineering of semantically-rich formalisms coupled with statistical preferences". He is the John H. Dessaurer Professor of Computer Science at the University of Rochester.

== Biography ==
Allen received his Ph.D. from the University of Toronto in 1979, under the supervision of C. Raymond Perrault, after which he joined the faculty at Rochester. At Rochester, he was department chair from 1987 to 1990, directed the Cognitive Science Program from 1992 to 1996, and co-directed the Center for the Sciences of Language from 1996 to 1998. He served as the Editor-in-Chief of Computational Linguistics from 1983–1993. Since 2006 he has also been associate director of the Florida Institute for Human and Machine Cognition.

== Academic life ==
=== TRIPS project ===
The TRIPS project is a long-term research to build generic technology for dialogue (both spoken and 'chat') systems, which includes natural language processing, collaborative problem solving, and dynamic context-sensitive language modeling. This is contrast with the data driven approaches by machine learning, which requires to collect and annotate corpora, i.e. training data, firstly.

=== PLOW agent ===
PLOW agent is a system that learns executable task models from a single collaborative learning session, which integrates wide AI technologies including deep natural language understanding, knowledge representation and reasoning, dialogue systems, planning/agent-based systems, and machine learning. This paper won the outstanding paper award at AAAI in 2007.

== Selected works ==
=== Books ===
Allen is the author of the textbook Natural Language Understanding (Benjamin-Cummings, 1987; 2nd ed., 1995).

He is also the co-author with Henry Kautz, Richard Pelavin, and Josh Tenenberg of Reasoning About Plans (Morgan Kaufmann, 1991).

=== Articles ===
- 2007. PLOW: A Collaborative Task Learning Agent. (with Nathanael Chambers et al) AAAI'07

won the outstanding paper award at AAAI in 2007.

- 2006. Chester: Towards a Personal Medication Advisor. (with N. Blaylock, et al) Biomedical informatics 39(5)
- 1998. TRIPS: An Integrated Intelligent Problem-Solving Assistant. (with George Ferguson) AAAI'98
- 1983. Maintaining Knowledge about Temporal Intervals. CACM 26, 11, 832-843

== Awards and honors ==
In 1991 he was elected as a fellow of the Association for the Advancement of Artificial Intelligence (1990, founding fellow).

In 1992 he became the Dessaurer Professor at Rochester.
