= Dandelon.com =

Dandelon.com is a search engine for the academic community, started in 2004. The solution was invented in 2001 by Manfred Hauer of AGI and Karl Raedler from Vorarlberger Landesbibliothek, Austria. dandelon.com community is a European pioneer in catalog enrichment. Linked libraries digitize tables of contents of books and capture details of periodicals by using OCR, text analytics, machine translation and put results to catalogues, discovery engines and library sharing centers for cross language and multilingual retrieval.

== Literature ==
- Manfred Hauer: 2012 "Web 2.0: Which features are wanted by academic library clients? A HEBIS Survey Report" (PDF; 172 kB) Gulf special library association (SLA), Conference Proceeding - on CD
- Nienerza, Heike / Sunckel, Bettina / Meier, Berthold: 2011 "Unser Katalog soll besser werden! Kataloge und Portale im Web-2.0-Zeitalter. Ergebnisse einer Online-Umfrage im HeBIS-Verbund" ABI-Technik, De Gruyter, Berlin, Issue 31, pp. 130–149, DOI: 10.1515/ABI.2011.020
- Manfred Hauer: 2013 "Zur Bedeutung normierter Terminologien in Zeiten moderner Sprach- und Information-Retrieval-Technologien" (PDF; 205 kB) ABI-Technik, De Gruyter, Berlin, issue 1, pp. 2–6
- Manfred Hauer, Rainer Diedrichs: 2010 "Kataloganreicherung in Europa" (PDF; 525 kB) Buch und Bibliothek , issue 5, pp. 394–397
- Karl Raedler: 2008 "Im 7. Jahr der Digitalisierung von Inhaltsverzeichnissen aus der Vorarlberger Landesbibliothek In: ABI-Technik, De Gruyter, Berlin, December, pp. 118-119
- Manfred Hauer: 2005 Vergleich der Retrievalleistungen von Bibliothekskatalogen gegen erweiterte und neue Konzept. Benchmarking: Google Scholar, dandelon.com, Vorarlberger Landesbibliothek, weitere OPACs. In: ABI-Technik, De Gruyter, Berlin, December, pp. 295–301.
- Karl, Raedler: 2004 "In Bibliotheken "googeln" - In Bibliothekskatalogen "googlen" : Integration von Inhaltsverzeichnissen, Volltexten und WEB-Ressourcen in Bibliothekskataloge" ABI-TechnikDe Gruyter, Berlin, pp. 262–268
