= Unstructured data =

Information without a formal data model

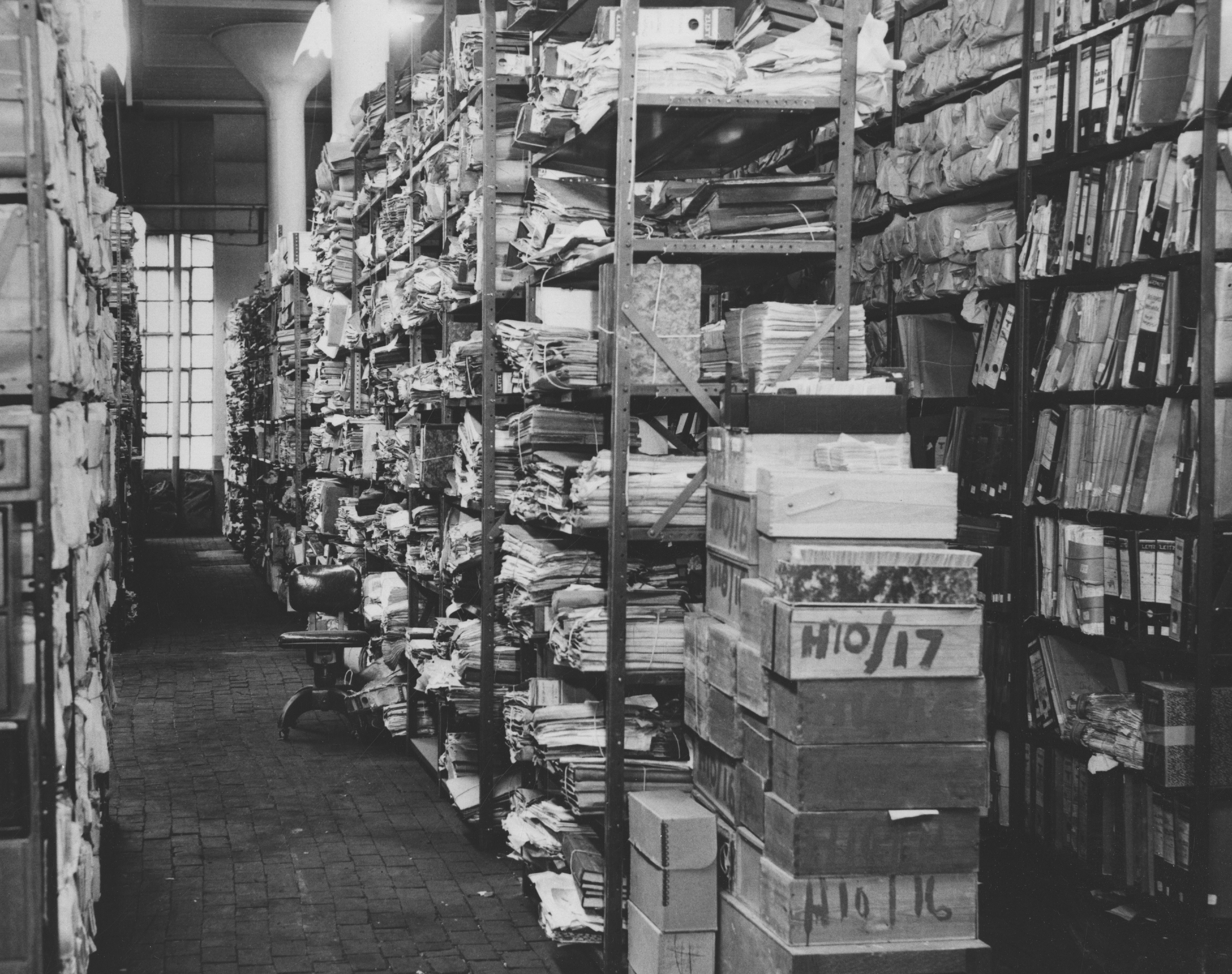
Unsorted records captured from Nazi Germany at the U.S. National Archives Military Records Center in Alexandria, Virginia, 1956

Unstructured data (or unstructured information) is information that either does not have a pre-defined data model or is not organized in a pre-defined manner. Unstructured information is typically text-heavy, but may contain data such as dates, numbers, and facts as well. This results in irregularities and ambiguities that make it difficult to understand using traditional programs as compared to data stored in fielded form in databases or annotated (semantically tagged) in documents.

In 1998, Merrill Lynch said "unstructured data comprises the vast majority of data found in an organization, some estimates run as high as 80%." It is unclear what the source of this number is, but nonetheless it is accepted by some. Other sources have reported similar or higher percentages of unstructured data.

In 2012, the International Data Corporation (IDC) and the Dell EMC projected that data would grow to 40 zettabytes by 2020, resulting in a 50-fold growth from the beginning of 2010. More recently, IDC and Seagate predict that the global datasphere will grow to 163 zettabytes by 2025 and majority of that will be unstructured. The Computer World magazine states that unstructured information might account for more than 70–80% of all data in organizations.

== Background ==
The earliest research into business intelligence focused in on unstructured textual data, rather than numerical data. As early as 1958, computer science researchers like H.P. Luhn were particularly concerned with the extraction and classification of unstructured text. However, only since the turn of the century has the technology caught up with the research interest. In 2004, the SAS Institute developed the SAS Text Miner, which uses Singular Value Decomposition (SVD) to reduce a hyper-dimensional textual space into smaller dimensions for significantly more efficient machine-analysis. The mathematical and technological advances sparked by machine textual analysis prompted a number of businesses to research applications, leading to the development of fields like sentiment analysis, voice of the customer mining, and call center optimization. The emergence of Big Data in the late 2000s led to a heightened interest in the applications of unstructured data analytics in contemporary fields such as predictive analytics and root cause analysis.

== Issues with terminology ==
The term is imprecise for several reasons:

1. Structure, while not formally defined, can still be implied.
2. Data with some form of structure may still be characterized as unstructured if its structure is not helpful for the processing task at hand.
3. Unstructured information might have some structure (semi-structured) or even be highly structured but in ways that are unanticipated or unannounced.

== Dealing with unstructured data ==
Techniques such as data mining, natural language processing (NLP), and text analytics provide different methods to find patterns in, or otherwise interpret, this information. Common techniques for structuring text usually involve manual tagging with metadata or part-of-speech tagging for further text mining-based structuring. The Unstructured Information Management Architecture (UIMA) standard provided a common framework for processing this information to extract meaning and create structured data about the information.

Software that creates machine-processable structure can utilize the linguistic, auditory, and visual structure that exist in all forms of human communication. Algorithms can infer this inherent structure from text, for instance, by examining word morphology, sentence syntax, and other small- and large-scale patterns. Unstructured information can then be enriched and tagged to address ambiguities and relevancy-based techniques then used to facilitate search and discovery. Examples of "unstructured data" may include books, journals, documents, metadata, health records, audio, video, analog data, images, files, and unstructured text such as the body of an e-mail message, Web page, or word-processor document. While the main content being conveyed does not have a defined structure, it generally comes packaged in objects (e.g. in files or documents, ...) that themselves have structure and are thus a mix of structured and unstructured data, but collectively this is still referred to as "unstructured data". For example, an HTML web page is tagged, but HTML mark-up typically serves solely for rendering. It does not capture the meaning or function of tagged elements in ways that support automated processing of the information content of the page. XHTML tagging does allow machine processing of elements, although it typically does not capture or convey the semantic meaning of tagged terms.

Since unstructured data commonly occurs in electronic documents, the use of a content or document management system which can categorize entire documents is often preferred over data transfer and manipulation from within the documents. Document management thus provides the means to convey structure onto document collections.

Search engines have become popular tools for indexing and searching through such data, especially text.

=== Approaches in natural language processing ===
Specific computational workflows have been developed to impose structure upon the unstructured data contained within text documents. These workflows are generally designed to handle sets of thousands or even millions of documents, or far more than manual approaches to annotation may permit. Several of these approaches are based upon the concept of online analytical processing, or OLAP, and may be supported by data models such as text cubes. Once document metadata is available through a data model, generating summaries of subsets of documents (i.e., cells within a text cube) may be performed with phrase-based approaches.

==== Information extraction ====
Information extraction (IE) is the task of automatically extracting structured information from unstructured and/or semi-structured machine-readable documents and other electronically represented sources. Typically, this involves processing human language texts by means of natural language processing (NLP). Recent activities in multimedia document processing like automatic annotation and content extraction out of images/audio/video/documents could be seen as information extraction.

Recent advances in NLP techniques have allowed for significantly improved performance compared to previous years. An example is the extraction from newswire reports of corporate mergers, such as denoted by the formal relation:

$$\operatorname{MergerBetween}(\mathrm{company}_1, \mathrm{company}_2, \mathrm{date})$$,

from an online news sentence such as:

"Yesterday, New York based Foo Inc. announced their acquisition of Bar Corp."

A broad goal of IE is to allow computation to be done on the previously unstructured data. A more specific goal is to allow automated reasoning about the logical form of the input data. Structured data is semantically well-defined data from a chosen target domain, interpreted with respect to category and context.

Information extraction is the part of a greater puzzle which deals with the problem of devising automatic methods for text management, beyond its transmission, storage and display. The discipline of information retrieval (IR) has developed automatic methods, typically of a statistical flavor, for indexing large document collections and classifying documents. Another complementary approach is that of natural language processing (NLP) which has solved the problem of modelling human language processing with considerable success when taking into account the magnitude of the task. In terms of both difficulty and emphasis, IE deals with tasks in between both IR and NLP. In terms of input, IE assumes the existence of a set of documents in which each document follows a template, i.e. describes one or more entities or events in a manner that is similar to those in other documents but differing in the details. An example, consider a group of newswire articles on Latin American terrorism with each article presumed to be based upon one or more terroristic acts. We also define for any given IE task a template, which is a(or a set of) case frame(s) to hold the information contained in a single document. For the terrorism example, a template would have slots corresponding to the perpetrator, victim, and weapon of the terroristic act, and the date on which the event happened. An IE system for this problem is required to "understand" an attack article only enough to find data corresponding to the slots in this template.

=== Approaches in medicine and biomedical research ===
Biomedical research generates one major source of unstructured data as researchers often publish their findings in scholarly journals. Though the language in these documents is challenging to derive structural elements from (e.g., due to the complicated technical vocabulary contained within and the domain knowledge required to fully contextualize observations), the results of these activities may yield links between technical and medical studies and clues regarding new disease therapies. Recent efforts to enforce structure upon biomedical documents include self-organizing map approaches for identifying topics among documents, general-purpose unsupervised algorithms, and an application of the CaseOLAP workflow to determine associations between protein names and cardiovascular disease topics in the literature. CaseOLAP defines phrase-category relationships in an accurate (identifies relationships), consistent (highly reproducible), and efficient manner. This platform offers enhanced accessibility and empowers the biomedical community with phrase-mining tools for widespread biomedical research applications.

== The use of "unstructured" in data privacy regulations ==
In Sweden (EU), pre 2018, some data privacy regulations did not apply if the data in question was confirmed as "unstructured". This terminology, unstructured data, is rarely used in the EU after GDPR came into force in 2018. GDPR does neither mention nor define "unstructured data". It does use the word "structured" as follows (without defining it);

- Parts of GDPR Recital 15, "The protection of natural persons should apply to the processing of personal data ... if ... contained in a filing system."
- GDPR Article 4, "'filing system' means any structured set of personal data which are accessible according to specific criteria ..."

GDPR Case-law on what defines a "filing system"; "the specific criterion and the specific form in which the set of personal data collected by each of the members who engage in preaching is actually structured is irrelevant, so long as that set of data makes it possible for the data relating to a specific person who has been contacted to be easily retrieved, which is however for the referring court to ascertain in the light of all the circumstances of the case in the main proceedings." (CJEU, Todistajat v. Tietosuojavaltuutettu, Jehovan, Paragraph 61).

If personal data is easily retrieved - then it is a filing system and - then it is in scope for GDPR regardless of being "structured" or "unstructured". Most electronic systems today, subject to access and applied software, can allow for easy retrieval of data.

== See also ==
- Clustering
- Pattern recognition
- List of text mining software
- Semi-structured data
- Structured data

== Notes ==
1. Today's Challenge in Government: What to do with Unstructured Information and Why Doing Nothing Isn't An Option, Noel Yuhanna, Principal Analyst, Forrester Research, Nov 2010
