= Transactions of the Association for Computational Linguistics =

Computational linguistics journal

- Discipline: Computational linguistics, Natural language processing
- Language: English
- Edited by: Aslı Çelikyılmaz, Roi Reichart, Dilek Hakkani-Tür

Publication details
- History: 2013–present
- Publisher: MIT Press on behalf of the Association for Computational Linguistics
- Frequency: Annual
- Open access: Yes
- License: CC-BY 4.0
- Impact factor: 10.9 (2022)

Standard abbreviations
- ISO 4: Trans. Assoc. Comput. Linguist.

Indexing
- ISSN: 2307-387X
- OCLC no.: 999414071

Links
- Journal homepage; Online access; Submission site

Transactions of the Association for Computational Linguistics (commonly abbreviated TACL) is an annual peer-reviewed open-access academic journal that publishes papers in the fields of computational linguistics and natural language processing. It is published by MIT Press for the Association for Computational Linguistics (ACL). TACL offers a hybrid approach between journal-style and conference-style publication: papers must adhere to conference-style formatting requirements, but undergo journal-style review. Additionally, researchers whose papers are accepted for publication by the journal are given the option to present their work at various ACL-sponsored conferences.

TACL accepts submissions all year, with a deadline on the first of every month, and accepted papers are made available online as soon as they are ready. However, only one volume is published for any given year. As of March 2024, Its editors-in-chief are Asli Celikyilmaz, Roi Reichart, and Dilek Hakkani-Tür.

TACL is one of the most influential journals in its domain. According to Journal Citation Reports, in 2022 the journal ranked first out of 194 journals in the "linguistics" category and 11th out of 145 journals in the "computer science (artificial intelligence)" category, with an impact factor of 10.9.

== Format ==
TACL is a journal, but it incorporates aspects of the conference-style publications that dominate in computational linguistics and most other subdisciplines of computer science today. Papers must conform to a format similar to that of popular conferences in the field, including a shorter page limit than is typical in journals. However, they undergo a journal-style reviewing process: reviewers may issue a recommendation that the authors of a paper "revise and resubmit", an option not typically available for conference reviewers. Researchers whose papers are accepted for publication by the journal have the option of presenting their work at an ACL-sponsored conference in the same or following year as when their paper is published. Thus, TACL gives researchers benefits associated with both the conference and traditional journal styles of publication.

== See also ==
- Association for Computational Linguistics
- Computational Linguistics
