= Sociedad Española para el Procesamiento del Lenguaje Natural =

Spanish professional organization devoted to computational linguistics

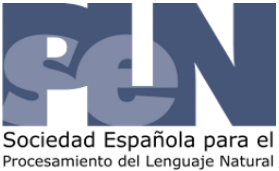
- Founded: 1983
- Type: Professional organization
- Purpose: Computational linguistics and natural language processing
- Region served: Worldwide, specially Spain and Latin America
- Method: Conferences, publications
- Key people: Felisa Verdejo Arantza Díaz de Ilarraza Sánchez
- Website: www.sepln.org

Sociedad Española para el Procesamiento del Lenguaje Natural (SEPLN, in English: Spanish association for Natural Language Processing) is a scientific and professional organization for researching natural language processing. Its namesake conference has been held each summer since 1983 in Spanish locations where computational linguistics research is carried out.

It was founded in 1983, and its purpose is to promote and divulge every kind of activity related to teaching, research and development in the natural language processing field, on both a national and international level. The first SEPLN president was Felisa Verdejo, when she was a professor at the University of the Basque Country in San Sebastián.

== Activities ==
Among the main activities of the SEPLN are the organization of an annual congress, which is attended by the research groups working in the natural language processing field, especially for Spanish, Catalan, Basque or Galician languages; the edition of the academic journal Procesamiento del Lenguaje Natural supported by a committee who guarantee some established criteria of quality and periodicity; a web server with information about issues related to natural language processing and an email service which inform about the current issues and is used as an open forum.

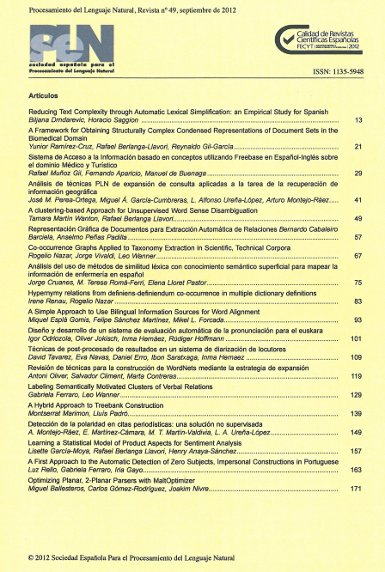
The journal Procesamiento del Lenguaje Natural in 2012

The journal is published every six months, so two issues per year are published (March and September) with the last advances in NLP. The Journal has the quality seal of the Spanish Foundation for Science and Technology (FECYT), which certifies it as a magazine of excellence, and therefore included in the Spanish Scientific Journals Repository (RECyT, Spanish Repository of Science and technology). The Journal received the seal of quality (ISO9001) in 2012, from the Spanish Federation of Science and Technology (FECYT). The Journal was indexed in the Emerging Sources Citation Index (ESCI) in 2016. The ESCI is the new edition of Web of Science, and Thonson Reuters is assessing the quality of the journals of ESCI in order to add those ones with a 'high scientific quality' in the Science Citation Index Expanded, Social Sciences Citation Index, and Arts & Humanities Citation Index.

== NLP community ==
The SEPLN society has built an academic community around natural language processing, coordinating more than thirty research groups working especially with any of these four languages: Spanish, Basque, Catalan and Galician. This community is a reference in Latin America and worldwide, especially because it has created models for the successful processing of Spanish and three minority languages.

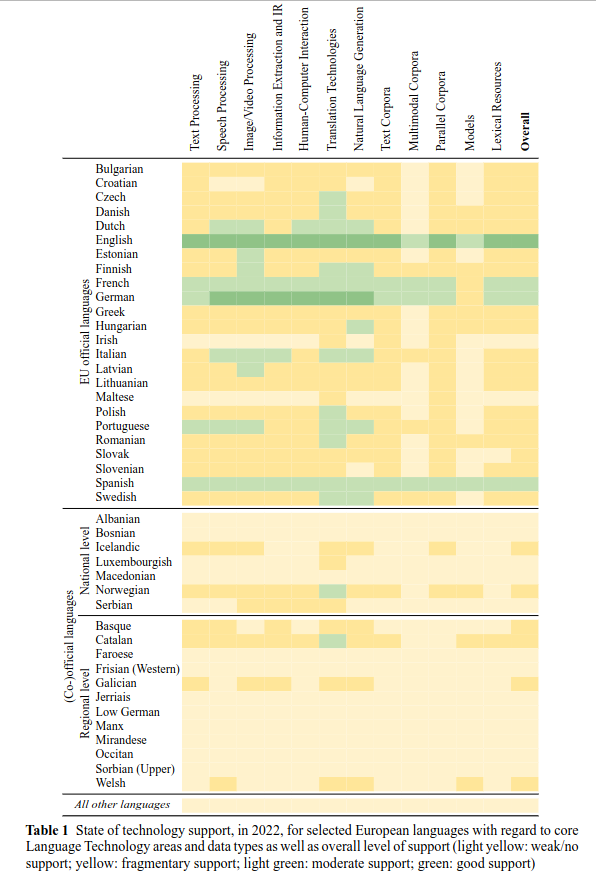
Technological language resources for 43 European languages by 2022.

The coordinated development of technology for Spanish, Basque, Catalan and Galician by this community has benefited the four languages as a whole. The Asturian and Aragonese languages have also been studied. This positive influence of SEPLN's activity can be seen in the ELE report that analysed the situation of European languages in language technology by 2022. Spanish was one of the four best resourced among the official languages, behind English, on a par with German and French; Catalan, Basque and Galician were the best placed among the non-official languages, along with Welsh, and were in a better position than some of the official or national languages (better than Irish Gaelic and Maltese).

European Language Grid (ELG, 2023-09-14) Language Resources Catalogue
Language	# Products	Reference (ELG search)
English	6,192	
Spanish	2,540	
German	2,382	
French	2,120	
Catalan	641	
Basque	353	
Galician	262	
Aragonese	30	
Asturian	21	

== Locations ==
This is the timeline of cities with a NLP group that organized SEPLN conferences:

- Coruña (2022)
- Málaga (2021)
- Virtual (2020)
- Bilbao (2019)
- Sevilla (2018)
- Murcia (2017)
- Salamanca (2016)
- Alicante (2015)
- Gerona (2014)
- Madrid (2013)
- Castellón (2012)
- Huelva (2011)
- Valencia (2010)
- San Sebastián (2009)
- Madrid (2008)
- Sevilla (2007)
- Zaragoza (2006)
- Granada (2005)
- Barcelona (2004)
- Alcalá de Henares (2003)
- Valladolid (2002)
- Jaén (2001)
- Vigo (2000)
- Lleida (1999)
- Alicante (1998)
- Madrid (1997)
- Sevilla (1996)
- Bilbao (1995)
- Córdoba (1994)
- Santiago de Compostela (1993)
- Granada (1992)
- Valencia (1991)
- San Sebastián (1990)
- Barcelona (1989)
- Madrid (1988)
- Barcelona (1987)

== Presidents ==
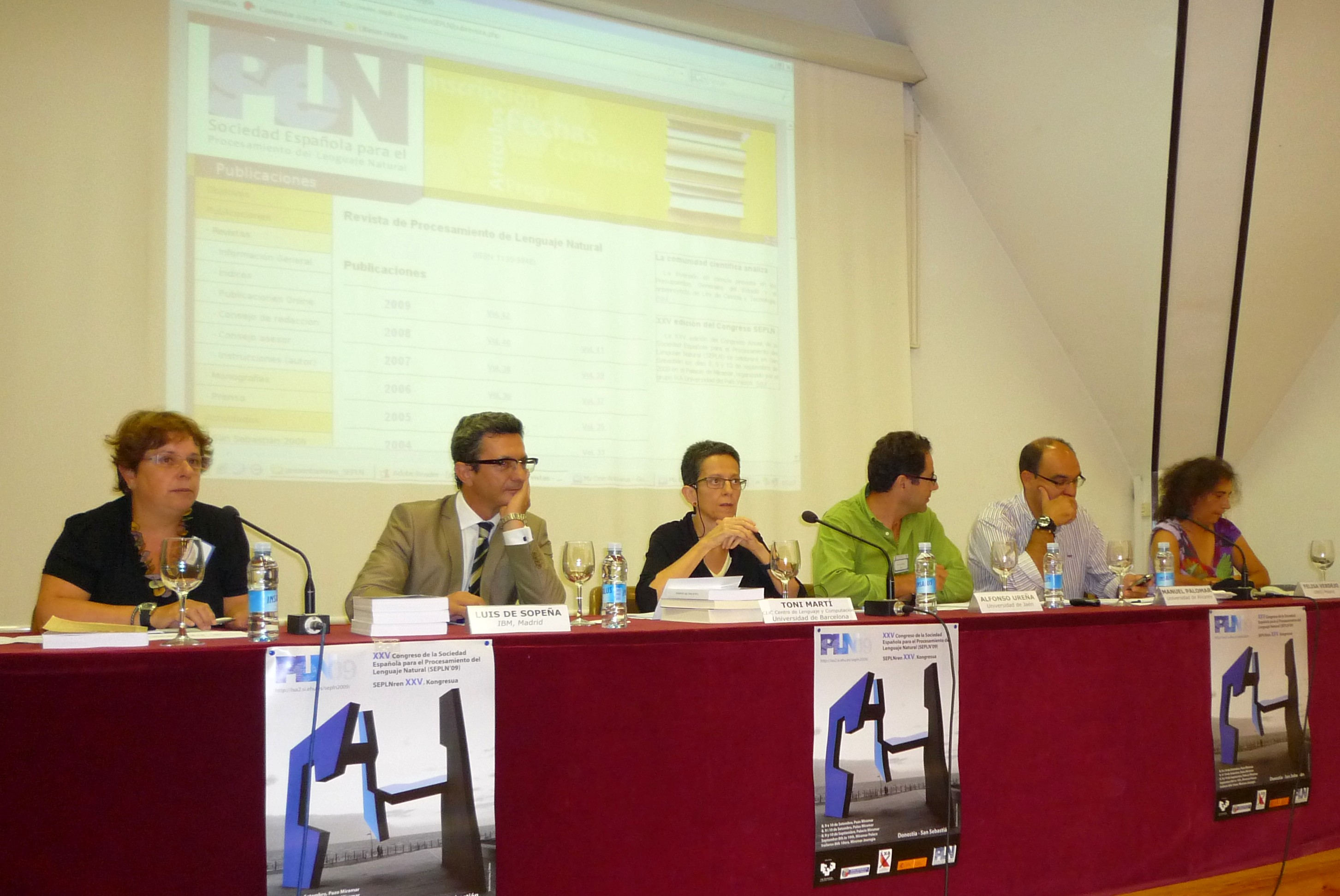
Round table in SEPLN conference (2009)

The presidents who have governed this society since its creation have been the following:

Years	Name
2007–2023	L. Alfonso Ureña
1996–2007	Manuel Palomar
1990–1996	Maria Antònia Martí
1984–1990	Felisa Verdejo
1983–1984	Luis Sopeña

== See also ==
- Association for Computational Linguistics
