= IBM Omnifind =

Former B2B software product

IBM OmniFind was an enterprise search platform from IBM. It did come in several packages adapted to different business needs, including OmniFind Enterprise Edition, OmniFind Enterprise Starter Edition, and OmniFind Discovery Edition. IBM OmniFind as a standalone product was withdrawn in April 2011 and is now part of IBM Watson Content Analytics with Enterprise Search.

IBM OmniFind Yahoo! Edition was a free-of-charge version that could handle up to 500,000 documents in its index and was intended for small businesses. IBM OmniFind Yahoo! Edition was simple to install, provided a user friendly front end for administration, and incorporated technology from the open source Lucene project. IBM withdrew this product from marketing effective September 22, 2010 and withdrew support effective June 30, 2011.

IBM OmniFind Personal E-mail Search was a research product launched in 2007 for doing semantic search over personal emails by extracting and organizing concepts and relationships (such as phone numbers and addresses). The project appears to have been silently abandoned sometimes around 2010.

== See also ==
- LanguageWare
- UIMA
