= Garrison Cottrell =

American cognitive scientist and computer scientist

- Occupations: Computer Scientist, academic, author and researcher

Academic background
- Education: B.S., Mathematics and Sociology; M.A.T., Mathematics Education; M.S., Computer Science; Ph.D., Computer Science
- Alma mater: Cornell University; University of Rochester
- Academic advisors: James F. Allen; David Rumelhart

Academic work
- Institutions: University of California, San Diego
- Notable students: Christopher Kanan

Garrison W. Cottrell is an American cognitive scientist and computer scientist who serves as a Professor of Computer Science and Engineering at the University of California, San Diego (UC San Diego). His research focuses on computational neuroscience, machine learning, and cognitive modeling, with particular emphasis on how the brain processes visual information and language. Cottrell was the founding director and principal investigator of the Temporal Dynamics of Learning Center (TDLC), an interdisciplinary consortium funded by the National Science Foundation to investigate how learning unfolds over time. In 2017, he was named a Fellow of the Cognitive Science Society for his contributions to the field.

== Education and career ==
Cottrell obtained his bachelor's degrees in mathematics and sociology as well as an M.A.T. in mathematics education from Cornell University. He then earned an M.S. and a Ph.D. in computer science at the University of Rochester, where he studied with James F. Allen. Following postdoctoral research under David Rumelhart, he joined the faculty at UC San Diego.

Cottrell began his career at UC San Diego as an assistant professor in the Department of Computer Science and Engineering, achieving the rank of full professor in 1997. From 2006 onward, he served as founding director and principal investigator of the Temporal Dynamics of Learning Center (TDLC), a multi-institutional research initiative funded as one of the NSF’s Science of Learning Centers. Cottrell and his collaborators studied the role of timing and temporal patterns in learning across disciplines including neuroscience, psychology, and computer science.

== Research ==
Cottrell’s research integrates computational models and experimental data to better understand visual perception, attention, language processing, and higher-level cognition. His work in face recognition garnered attention when a study co-authored with Janet Hsiao suggested that the first two eye fixations—often near the center of the face—are sufficient for accurate recognition. Beyond face perception, his group has contributed to saliency-based vision models, neural network approaches for time-series prediction, and computational studies of reading and language comprehension.

== Selected publications ==
- Dollár, P., Rabaud, V., Cottrell, G., & Belongie, S. (2005). “Behavior recognition via sparse spatio-temporal features.” In 2005 IEEE International Workshop on Visual Surveillance and Performance Evaluation of Tracking and Surveillance (pp. 65–72). IEEE.
- Zhang, L., Tong, M.H., Marks, T.K., Shan, H., & Cottrell, G.W. (2008). “SUN: A Bayesian Framework for Saliency Using Natural Statistics.” Journal of Vision, 8(7), 32.
- Qin, Y., Song, D., Chen, H., Cheng, W., Jiang, G., & Cottrell, G. (2017). “A Dual-Stage Attention-based Recurrent Neural Network for Time Series Prediction.” arXiv preprint arXiv:1704.02971.
- Valentin, D., Abdi, H., O’Toole, A.J., & Cottrell, G.W. (1994). “Connectionist Models of Face Processing: A Survey.” Pattern Recognition, 27(9), 1209–1230.

== Honors and awards ==
2017 – Fellow, Cognitive Science Society
