= C. Raymond Perrault =

Director of Artificial Intelligence Center

Raymond Perrault
- Education: McGill University; University of Michigan
- Scientific career
- Fields: Artificial intelligence
- Workplaces: University of Toronto; SRI International
- Thesis: Augmented Transition Networks and Their Relation to Tree Manipulation Systems (1975)
- Doctoral advisor: Joyce Friedman; William Rounds
- Doctoral students: James F. Allen
- Other notable students: Henry Kautz

Charles Raymond Perrault is an artificial intelligence researcher and a Distinguished Computer Scientist at SRI International. He was a co-principal investigator of the CALO project, which is the predecessor for several AI technologies including Siri.

== Education ==
Perrault received a bachelor of science in mathematics from McGill University and a Ph.D. in computer and communication sciences from the University of Michigan in 1975.

== Career ==
Perrault was a faculty member of the University of Toronto from 1974 to 1983, rising from assistant to full professor.

He started at SRI International in 1983, and was the director of the Artificial Intelligence Center from 1987 to 2017. While at SRI, he was a co-principal investigator of the CALO project and is also a founder of the Center for the Study of Language and Information.

== Memberships and awards ==
Perrault was the co-editor in chief of the journal Artificial Intelligence from 2001 to 2010, the president and a trustee of the International Joint Conferences on Artificial Intelligence from 1992 to 2001, and was president of the Association for Computational Linguistics in 1983.

In 1990, Perrault was named a founding fellow of the American Association for Artificial Intelligence and in 2018 of American Association for Advancement of Science In July 2011, he won the Donald E. Walker Distinguished Service Award from the International Joint Conferences on Artificial Intelligence.
