= Computational Linguistics (journal) =

- Discipline: Computational linguistics
- Language: English
- Edited by: Wei Lu

Publication details
- Former name: American Journal of Computational Linguistics
- History: 1974–present
- Publisher: Association for Computational Linguistics; MIT Press
- Frequency: Quarterly
- Open access: Yes
- License: CC BY-NC-ND 4.0
- Impact factor: 13.4 (2025)

Standard abbreviations
- ISO 4: Comput. Linguist.

Indexing
- ISSN: 0891-2017 (print); 1530-9312 (web)
- LCCN: 88654977
- OCLC no.: 44539138

Links
- Journal homepage; Online access

Computational Linguistics is a quarterly peer-reviewed open-access academic journal in the field of computational linguistics. It is published by MIT Press for the Association for Computational Linguistics (ACL). The journal includes articles, squibs and book reviews. It was established as the American Journal of Computational Linguistics in 1974 by David Hays and was originally published only on microfiche until 1978. George Heidorn transformed it into a print journal in 1980, with quarterly publication. In 1984 the journal obtained its current title. It has been open-access since 2009.

According to the Journal Citation Reports, the journal has a 2025 impact factor of 13.4.

== Editors-in-chief ==
The following persons are or have been editors-in-chief:

- David G. Hays (1974–1978)
- George Heidorn (1980–1982)
- James F. Allen (1982–1993)
- Julia Hirschberg (1993–2003)
- Robert Dale (2003–2014)
- Paola Merlo (2014–2018)
- Hwee Tou Ng (2018–2023)
- Wei Lu (2024–Present)

== See also ==
- Association for Computational Linguistics
- Transactions of the Association for Computational Linguistics
