= Henry Kautz =

American computer scientist (born 1956)

Henry A. Kautz
- Born: 1956 (age 69–70); Youngstown, Ohio
- Education: University of Rochester (PhD 1987); University of Toronto (MS 1982); Johns Hopkins University (MA 1980); Cornell University (AB 1978); Case Institute of Technology (1974-1975)
- Awards: IJCAI Computers and Thought Award (1989); AAAI Fellow (1997) AAAS Fellow (2006); ACM Fellow (2013)
- Scientific career
- Fields: Artificial Intelligence; Data science Pervasive Computing
- Workplaces: University of Virginia; University of Rochester; Kodak Research Laboratories; University of Washington; AT&T Laboratories; Bell Labs
- Thesis: A Formal Theory of Plan Recognition. (1987)
- Doctoral advisor: James F. Allen
- Other academic advisors: C. Raymond Perrault (master supervisor)
- Website: www.cs.rochester.edu/u/kautz/

Henry A. Kautz (born 1956) is a computer scientist and a professor of computer science at the University of Virginia. He formerly served as the Founding Director of Institute for Data Science and Professor at University of Rochester. He is interested in knowledge representation, artificial intelligence, data science and pervasive computing.

== Biography ==
Kautz was born in 1956 in Youngstown, Ohio.

Kautz entered the Case Institute of Technology in 1974, then a year later, transferred to Cornell University and got his B.A. in English and in mathematics in 1978 there. He wrote plays during a one-year fellowship creative writing program at Johns Hopkins University and got an M.A. by the Writing Seminars in 1980. As a foreign student supported by the Connaught Fellowship, he enrolled at University of Toronto in 1980. Kautz completed his master thesis A First-Order Dynamic Logic for Planning under the supervision of C. Raymond Perrault, and then received his M.S. in computer science in 1982. Before receiving his Ph.D. from University of Rochester in 1987 he was a teaching assistant for Patrick Hayes and a teaching assistant and research assistant for his thesis advisor James F. Allen. His PhD thesis was titled A Formal Theory of Plan Recognition (1987).

Kautz was a professor of computer science at University of Washington (2000-2006) after worked at AT&T Bell Labs and AT&T Laboratories. He then became a professor at the University of Rochester in 2007 and Founding Director of the Institute for Data Science after working as a director of Intelligent Systems at Kodak Research Laboratories (2006-2007). In 2024, he moved to the University of Virginia where he is a professor of computer science.

== Selected works ==
Kautz works on wide areas ranging from planning, knowledge representation and artificial Intelligence to data mining, human computation and crowdsourcing, ubiquitous computing, wearable computers, assistive technology and health.

=== Books ===
- 1991. Reasoning About Plans. (with James F. Allen, R. Pelavin, and J. Tenenberg) Morgan Kaufmann, 1991. ISBN 978-1493306138

=== Articles ===
- 2013. 10-Year Impact Award ACM International Joint Conference on Pervasive and Ubiquitous Computing
- 2013. Notable Paper First AAAI Conference on Human Computation and Crowdsourcing (HCOMP)
- 2012. Best Paper Fifth ACM International Conference on Web Search and Data Mining (WSDM)
- 2005. Best Paper IEEE International Symposium on Wearable Computers (ISWC)
- 2004 & 2006. 1st Place ICAPS Planning Competition (Optimal Track)
- 1996 & 2004. Best Paper Conference on Artificial Intelligence (AAAI)
- 1993 & 2012. Notable Paper Conference on Artificial Intelligence (AAAI)
- 1989. Best Paper International Conference on Knowledge Representation & Reasoning (KRR)
- 1988. Best Paper Canadian Society for Computational Studies of Intelligence (CSCSI)

=== Patent ===
- 1993. Optimization of Information Bases. US patent issued November 1993
- 1997. Mechanism for Constraint Satisfaction. US patent issued June 1997
- 1997. Message Filtering Techniques. US patent issued April 1997

=== AI Limericks ===
Henry Kautz created limericks on AI, which can be seen here (retrieved January 14 2015).

== Awards and honors ==
- 1989. IJCAI Computers and Thought Award.

the premier award for artificial intelligence researchers under the age of 35.

- 1991. AAAI Fellow.

"For contributions to many areas of artificial intelligence, from plan recognition to knowledge representation to software agents."

- 2006. AAAS Fellow.
- 2010-2012. President of AAAI.
- 2013. ACM Fellow.

"For contributions to artificial intelligence and pervasive computing with applications to assistive technology and health."

- 2013. 10-Year Impact Award of ACM International Joint Conference on Pervasive and Ubiquitous Computing.
- 2018. ACM-AAAI Allen Newell Award.
