= Li Sheng (artist) =

Chinese landscape artist

Buddha's Conversion of Five Bhiksu

Li Sheng (Chinese: 李升, fl. 1346) was a Chinese landscape artist during the Yuan dynasty. His brush painting Saying Farewell by the Lake Dianshan (淀山送别图, 1346) is in the Shanghai Museum. His handscroll Buddha's Conversion of Five Bhiksu is in the collection of the Cleveland Museum of Art.

== See also ==
- Chinese painting in the Song and Yuan dynasties (960–1368)
