= Maria Antònia Martí =

Spanish Catalan linguist

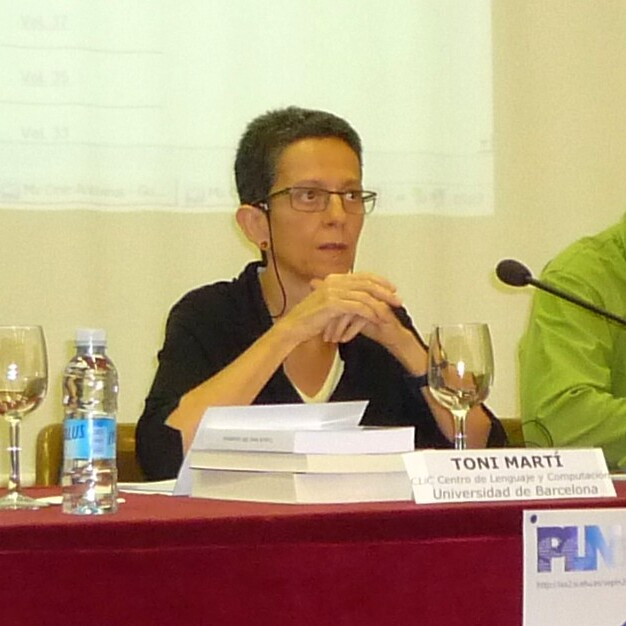
- Marti in 2009
- Born: Maria Antonia Martí Antonín
- Other name: Toni Martí
- Occupations: linguist; professor
- Awards: 'Emprenedors 2000' Award

Academic background
- Education: University of Barcelona
- Thesis: Processament informàtic del llenguatge natural: un sistema d'anàlisi morfològica per ordinador (1988)
- Doctoral advisor: Maria Teresa Cabré

Academic work
- Discipline: Romance Philology
- Institutions: University of Barcelona; Open University of Catalonia; Language and Computation Center (CLiC)
- Main interests: language processing; computational modeling of linguistic knowledge; information extraction; development of linguistic engineering resources

Maria Antonia Martí Antonín (known as Toni Martí) is a Spanish Catalan linguist at the University of Barcelona, where she is Professor in the Department of General Linguistics and Catalan Philology and also Director of the Language and Computation Center (CLiC), a company for the provision of services and the development of linguistic engineering resources attached to the Barcelona Science Park.

== Education ==
Marti graduated in Romance Philology (Hispanic) in 1973 and has a PhD in Romance Philology from the University of Barcelona since 1988 when she defended her thesis entitled Processament informàtic del llenguatge natural: un sistema d'anàlisi morfològica per ordinador (Natural language processing: a computer-based morphological analysis system) under the supervision of Maria Teresa Cabré.

== Career and research ==
Marti is a professor of Computational Linguistics at the University of Barcelona. She has also served as collaborating professor at the Open University of Catalonia (UOC), and is the author and coordinator of various teaching materials for Catalan philology studies at the university. Her research interests include language processing and computational modeling of linguistic knowledge, information extraction and the development of linguistic engineering resources.

She has created and promoted research groups in the fields of philology and Natural language processing, Computational Linguistics, Empirical Linguistics and Corpus linguistics. Her scientific achievements are reflected in her publications, in the research projects that on many occasions included large state and international consortia that she successfully brought together and led, and in the more than twelve doctoral theses she has supervised.

Her leadership capacity has been reflected in multiple efforts for the promotion and construction of the scientific community in her areas of work. This has included the creation and direction of CLiC, and serving as President of the scientific society Sociedad Española para el Procesamiento del Lenguaje Natural (SEPLN) from 1990 to 1996. She has also been a member of the program committee of SEPLN's international congress since 1993 and a member of the advisory board of its scientific journal.

In 2002, together with Joaquim Llisterri Boix, she published a book on natural language processing, describing both spoken and written language studies. The linguistic technologies that have become so familiar in the present day, associated with Artificial Intelligence, were not so well-known at the beginning of the 21st-century, but it was then that the foundations for their current success were being laid. In 2003, Mari and Juan Alberto Alonso Martín, with the UOC publishing house, a book that collected the state of the art in Language Technologies at that time. The digital version of more than 50 of Marti's publications are included in the Digital Repository of the University of Barcelona.

== Awards and honours ==
- 2000: 'Emprenedors 2000' Award for Project SCRIPTUM, ca:Centre d'Innovació i Desenvolupament Empresarial (CIDEM), Generalitat de Catalunya.
