= DigitalMR =

DigitalMR Ltd. dba listening247
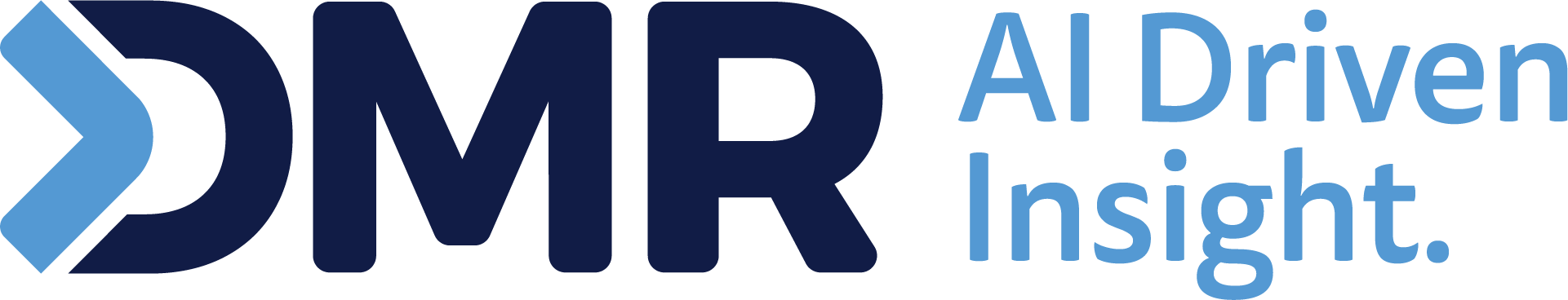
- New logo after rebranding to DMR
- Industry: Digital Media Agency
- Founded: 2010
- Founder: Michalis Michael (CEO)
- Headquarters: London, UK
- Area served: Worldwide
- Key people: Michalis Michael, Dr. Nicos Rossides, Peter Nathanial, Darren Kramer, Justin Stead
- Products: listening247, engaging247, communities247
- Services: Audience targeting and social Ad creation, Social Media Listening, Social Media Management, Private Online Communities, Co-creation, Influencer Marketing
- Number of employees: Employees and external associates in the UK, Poland, Serbia, Thailand, Cyprus, and South Africa.
- Website: listening247.com

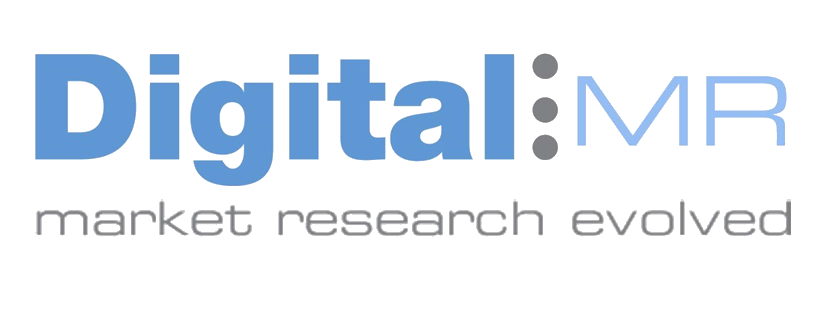
DigitalMR old logo, used until 2017

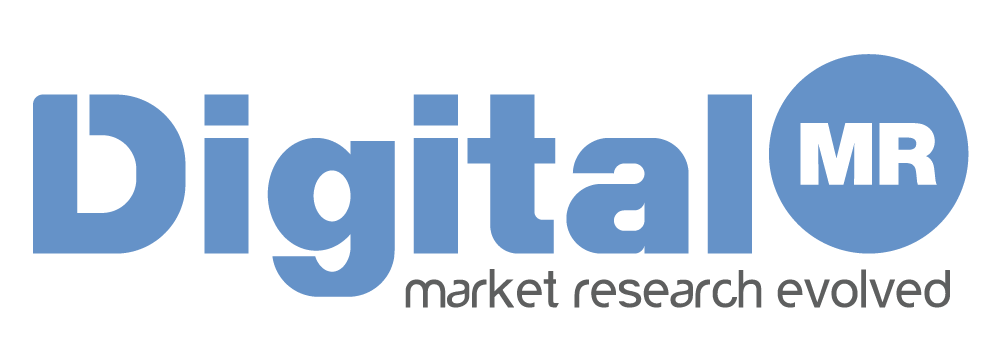
DigitalMR logo used from 2017 to 2021

listening247 is a tech company specialised in using Artificial Intelligence to create intelligent datasets and automating social media ad creation targeting brand relevant conversations. DigitalMR rebranded in August 2021 to DMR and in September 2024 to listening247. With its headquarters in London, UK, parent company in Cyprus, and team members in multiple countries, it offers its SaaS and DaaS solutions globally. The company was founded in 2010 and began full operations in 2012, emerging as a tech-driven solution for consumer insights. It company has corporate and individual staff memberships, with YPO, ESOMAR, MRS (Market Research Society), Insights Association.

== History ==
In August 2010 when DigitalMR was established, founder, Michalis Michael, had been MD for Western Europe at Masmi, and prior to that, head of the global online division at Synovate, a multinational in market research ranking number 6 globally at the time. Masmi - a current client - has supported the company from the start, in fact DigitalMR was incubated from within Masmi in London. The first advisory board was made up of the following individuals: Dr.Nicos Rossides; CEO at Masmi, Steve Alexander; president at Symmetrics, Stavros Hadjiyiangou; Managing Partner at A.T.A Associates LLP, Simon Preston; CEO at risebeyond.org and former Young Presidents' Organization international chairman, Peter Nathanial; partner at Impala partners and former Group Chief Risk Officer for RBS, and Neil Everitt; investor and entrepreneur. In August 2011, Michalis Michael participated in an online debate on research and privacy in relation to social media, hosted by GreenBook blog. Michael supported that if the new ESOMAR and MRS guidelines on privacy, anonymity, and consent were to be implemented, software development companies would probably prevail in the sector. He was the first one to respond in this discussion through a blog post, questioning the Market Research Society's position on the subject, and argued that people posting online actually want to be heard, and are aware of the potential consequences. In 2012, the company headquarters moved from their previous location to a larger space at Westminster Business Square in Vauxhall.

This is when the company pivoted to becoming a technology company after winning its first R&D grant from the Technology Strategy Board in the UK - now called Innovate UK. listening247 focussed on purposeful R&D for the next 7 years having won another 5 grants from Innovate UK and one from the EU.

In May 2020 the company which was already a "remote first" kind of company - nudged by the COVID-19 situation - went fully distributed with its new office address at Henry Wood House in Oxford Circus in Central of London. Its current office location is at the Liberty House, on Regents str in London.

In November 2023 listening247 raised its first institutional funding round and launched a typical start-up journey as an automated audience targeting and content creation company for brands.

== Networking ==
=== Partners ===
listening247 had through the years a number of agency partners offering its products to clients in their own countries, including Cocedal, MindTake, Aha Moments, Masmi, Nielsen, NielsenIQ, Blauw, Merlin Communications, Values, IOA in Europe, Asia, Africa and LATAM, as well as Decision Analyst in the USA.

== Competitions and awards ==
In late 2011, the listening247 blog was nominated for the 'Top New Market Research Blogs of 2012' annual competition. The blog had also received a badge from Next Generation Market Research as one of the most influential in research. During the same year, Michalis Michael was one of the individual finalists for the 'Next Gen Market Research Innovation Award'. In 2013, the listening247 online communities platform won the ‘Best Implementation of Enterprise Gamification’ award by Ovum for the use of gamification in market research. In early 2014, listening247 was announced as a finalist for the Digital Innovation-Advertising contest in the category of Next Generation Social Media Analytics. Also, listening247 was a runner up in a competition to win a place at the UK Trade & Investment Pavilion at CeBIT 2014. Both were supported by IC tomorrow, a Technology Strategy Board programme.
