= PoolParty Semantic Suite =

- Developer(s): Semantic Web Company
- Stable release: 8.1 LTS
- Written in: Java
- Operating system: Windows, Mac, Linux
- License: Commercial
- Website: https://www.poolparty.biz/

The PoolParty Semantic Suite is a technology platform provided by the Semantic Web Company. The EU-based company belongs to the early pioneers of the Semantic Web movement. The product uses standards-based technologies, namely the Resource Description Framework (RDF), as defined by W3C, which prevents vendor lock-in.
