= North American Chapter of the Association for Computational Linguistics =

Professional organization devoted to linguistics

Nations of the Americas Chapter of the Association for Computational Linguistics
- Type: professional organization
- Purpose: computational linguistics / natural language processing
- Origins: Association for Computational Linguistics
- Region served: Americas
- Method: conferences, publications
- Website: www.naacl.org

The Nations of the Americas Chapter of the Association for Computational Linguistics (NAACL; previously North American Chapter of the Association for Computational Linguistics) provides a regional focus for members of the Association for Computational Linguistics (ACL) in North America as well as in Central and South America, organizes annual conferences, promotes cooperation and information exchange among related scientific and professional societies, encourages and facilitates ACL membership by people and institutions in the Americas, and provides a source of information on regional activities for the ACL Executive Committee. The conference name was changed to the Nations of the Americas Chapter of the Association for Computational Linguistics in 2025.

NAACL was formed in 1998 for the purposes of encouraging and facilitating membership in the Association by persons and institutions in North America, providing a regional focus for members of the Association in North America and a source of information on North American activities for the Association Executive Committee, disseminating of Association and Chapter publications and information materials, and promoting cooperation and information exchange among related scientific and professional societies within North America.

== NAACL-HLT ==
In years equivalent to zero or two modulo three, the NAACL hosts in a North American city the NAACL-HLT conference (North American Chapter of the Association for Computational Linguistics-Human Language Technologies). In years equivalent to one modulo three, the ACL hosts the ACL conference in North America and there is no NAACL-HLT conference. The conference has about a 22% acceptance rate of papers, and highlights its Best Paper awards each year.

The conference began in the year 2000. The letters HLT stand for "Human Language Technologies", the name of a conference that in 2003 merged with the NAACL conference. From 2003 through 2019, the conference organizers put the letters HLT in the front (HLT-NAACL). However, starting in 2021, the conference organizers have put the letters NAACL in the front (NAACL-HLT).

Dates	Location
2025 April 29–May 4	Albuquerque, New Mexico
2024 June 16–21	Mexico City, Mexico
2022 July 10–15	Seattle, Washington
2021 June 6–11	~~Mexico City, Mexico~~ Online due to COVID-19
2019 June 2–9	Minneapolis, Minnesota
2018 June 1–6	New Orleans, Louisiana
2016 June 12–17	San Diego, California
2015 May 31–June 5	Denver, Colorado
2013 June 9–15	Atlanta, Georgia
2012 June 3–8	Montreal, Quebec
2010 June 1–6	Los Angeles, California
2009 May 31–June 5	Boulder, Colorado
2007 April 22–27	Rochester, New York
2006 June 4–9	New York City, New York
2004 May 2–7	Boston, Massachusetts
2003 May 27–June 1	Edmonton, Alberta
2001 June 2–7	Pittsburgh, Pennsylvania
2000 April 29–May 4	Seattle, Washington
