= Tatiana Nikitina (linguist) =

Linguist

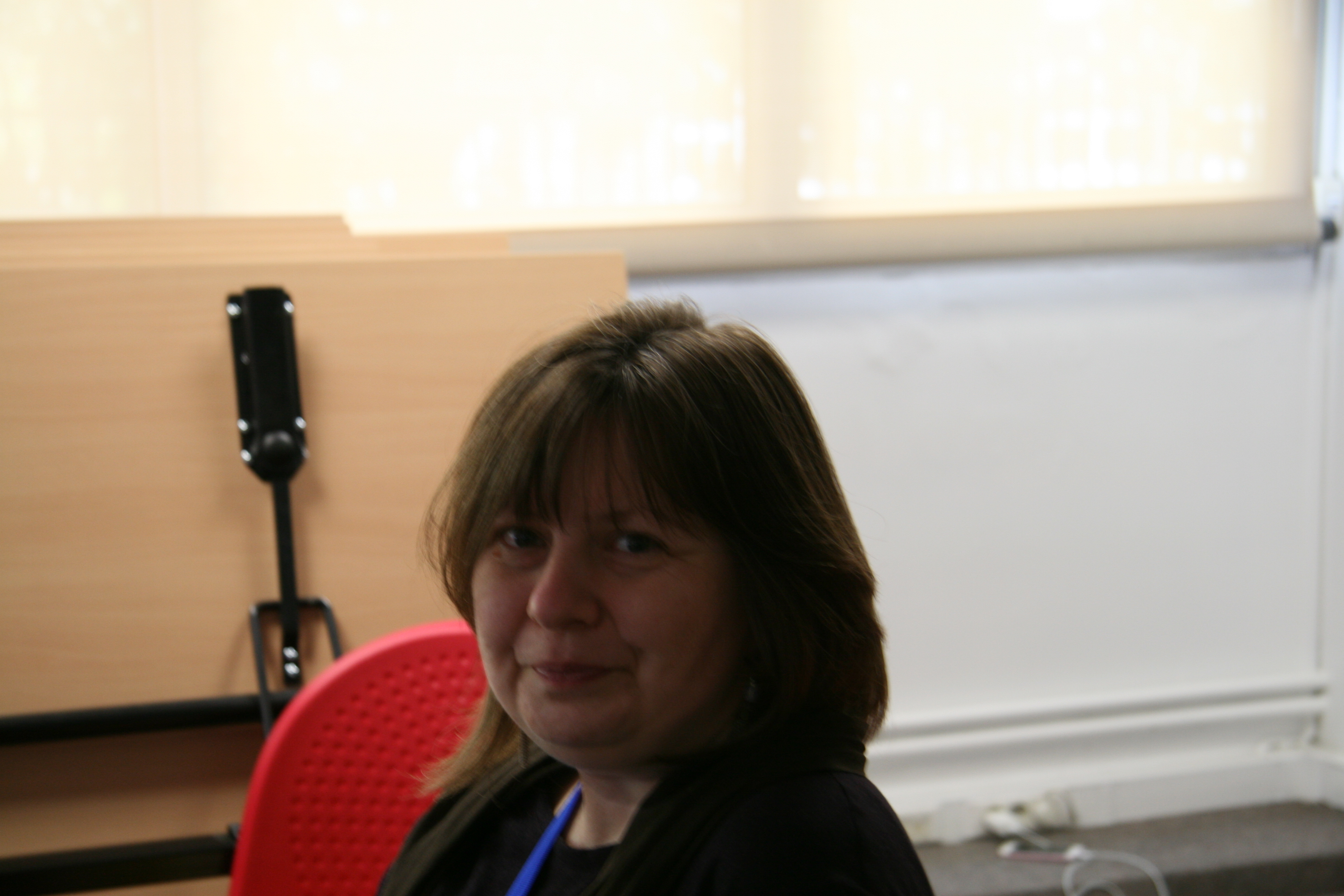
- Tatiana Nikitina in 2023

Tatiana Nikitina is a linguist conducting research into semantics, historical-comparative linguistics, formal syntax and linguistic typology. She has made a salient contribution to the study of reported speech. From an areal point of view, her work bears on Mande languages, Turkic languages, and some languages of Europe (Latin, Ancient Greek, Slavic languages). Nikitina was awarded the CNRS bronze medal in 2017 for her groundbreaking work in general linguistics.

== Career ==
Nikitina studied West African languages and cultures at St Petersburg University, then pursued a PhD at Stanford University (graduating in 2008). She was then a post-doctoral researcher at the TOPOI excellence cluster at Humbold University of Berlin. Nikitina joined CNRS in 2013 as a tenured researcher. She was a member of the Language, langues et cultures d'Afrique (fr) research centre, then of LACITO (Langues et Civilisations à Tradition Orale).

She passed her Habilitation in 2019.

From 2018 to 2023, she was the Principal Investigator of a European Research Council project, "Discourse Reporting in African Storytelling", that "explores strategies of discourse reporting characteristic of traditional narratives in African languages, and compares them to discourse reporting strategies attested in a number of Turkic languages spoken in Russia".

== Collective responsibilities and commitments ==
From 2018 to 2023, Nikitina was a member of the Scientific Council of the Institut des Sciences Humaines et Sociales (InSHS) of the CNRS. She is one of the signatories of an article published in 2019 about the organization of the CNRS in terms of recruitment and funding.

Nikitina is a member of the editorial board ofTransactions of the Philological Society, Faits de Langues and Language in Africa, and a member of the Scientific committee of the Journal of African Languages and Literatures (JALaLit). From 2018 to 2021, she was Review Editor for Linguistic Typology.

== Distinctions ==
Nikitina received in 2017 the bronze medal of CNRS "in recognition of the diversity of approaches, languages and linguistic phenomena covered by her work".

== Publications ==
- Tatiana Nikitina (2018). "Frames of reference in discourse: Spatial descriptions in Bashkir (Turkic)". Cognitive Linguistics. 29 (3): 495–544. doi:10.1515/cog-2016-0081.
- Stef Spronck; Tatiana Nikitina (2019). "Reported speech forms: a dedicated syntactic domain". Linguistic Typology. 23 (1): 119–159. doi:10.1515/lingty-2019-0005. hdl:10138/302557.
