= Data Discovery and Query Builder =

Data Discovery and Query Builder (DDQB) is a data abstraction technology, developed by IBM, that allows users to retrieve information from a data warehouse, in terms of the user's specific area of expertise instead of SQL.

DDQB serves the user through a web based graphical user interface and configurable data abstraction model (DAM), which contains both an understanding of the user knowledge domain and the database below it.

DDQB uses a set of Eclipse-based customization tooling and can be deployed as a set of web services.

== See also ==
- Business intelligence
- Ad hoc query
- Full text search
- Unstructured information
- Data access
- Information retrieval
- Information science

== Related Papers ==
- W.A. de Landgraaf, Data grids in theory and practice, 2008
