= Felisa Verdejo =

Spanish academic

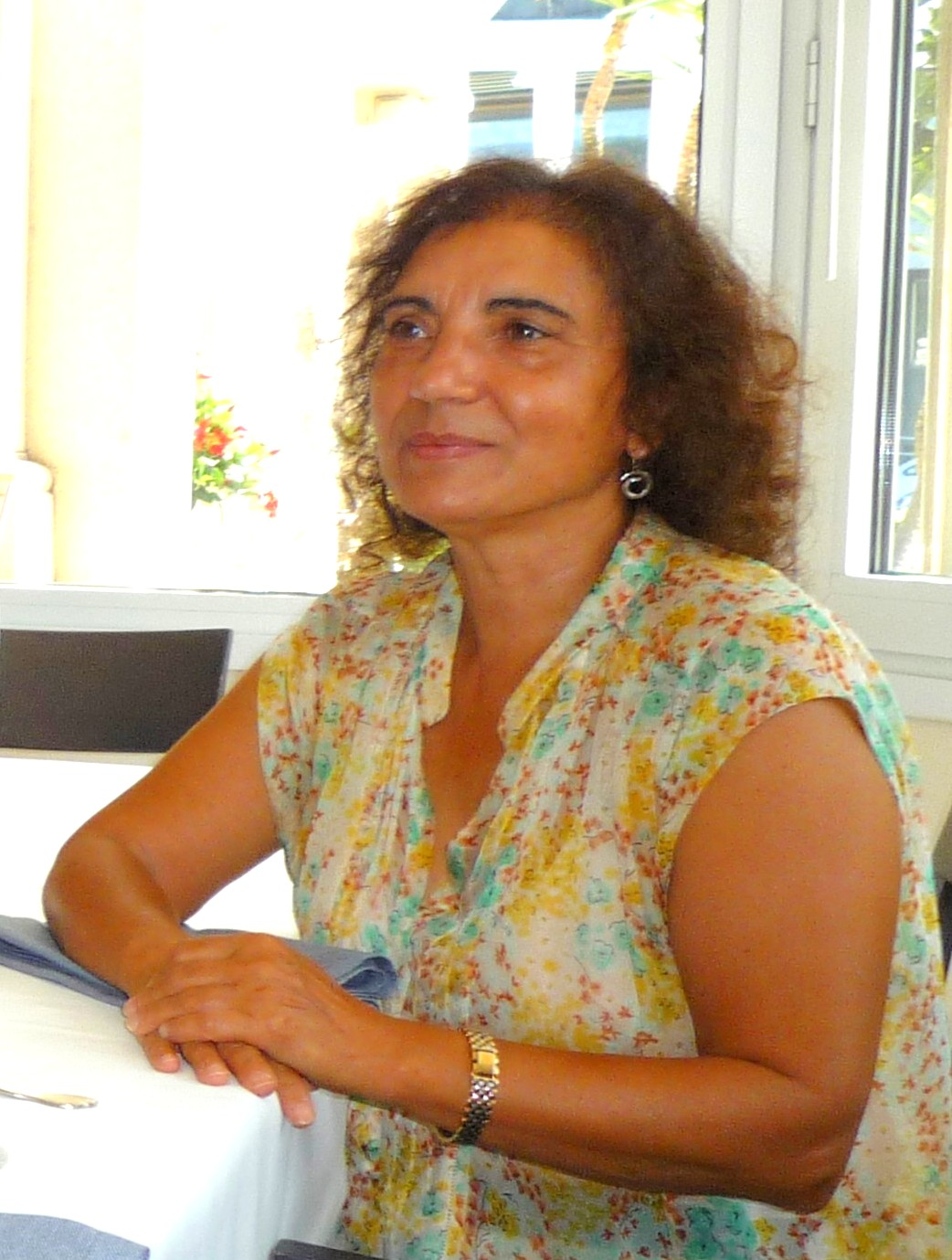
- Born: 1950 (age 75–76); Salamanca, Spain
- Occupation: University professor
- Known for: Pioneering work in natural language processing and artificial intelligence

María Felisa Verdejo Maillo (born 1950, Salamanca), known as Felisa Verdejo, is a university professor in the Department of Computer Languages and Systems at UNED. She is one of the Spanish pioneers in natural language processing and artificial intelligence.

== Biography ==
Verdejo has created and promoted research groups, in several universities, in the fields of natural language processing, artificial intelligence and distance education. She has taught and carried out research at four Spanish universities: Universidad Complutense (1978-1981), Universidad del País Vasco (1981-1985), Universidad Politécnica de Cataluña (1985-1991), and UNED (since 1991).

She opened and promoted a strategic line of research, dealing with the automatic processing of the Spanish language to integrate it into intelligent systems and a wide range of applications. Her scientific achievements are reflected in her publications, in the research projects that often included large consortia that she successfully brought together and led, and in the twenty doctoral theses she has supervised.

In 1983, when she was a professor of the University of the Basque Country in San Sebastián, she was one the creators of the Sociedad Española para el Procesamiento del Lenguaje Natural (SEPLN, in English: Spanish association for Natural Language Processing), a scientific and professional organization for people working on natural language processing.

== Awards ==
- ECCAI Fellow (2002)
- José García Santesmases National Prize in Computer Science (2014).
- Honorary doctorate from the University of Alicante (2019).
