= Zhou Ming (linguist) =

Chinese computer scientist, linguist, and executive

Zhou Ming (Chinese: 周明; pinyin: Zhōu Míng) is a Chinese computer scientist, linguist, and technology executive.

== Background ==
Zhou received his doctorate in computer science from Harbin Institute of Technology in 1991. During his studies, he played a role by developing CEMT-I, one of the earliest Chinese-English machine translation systems in China. Following his PhD, he joined Tsinghua University, where he led the development of J-Beijing, a Sino-Japanese machine translation system that achieved recognition in Japan.

His research focuses on machine translation, language learning, text generation, chatbots, and pre-trained models.

== Fellowships ==
- Fellow, Association for Computational Linguistics (ACL), 2023
- Fellow, Chinese Association for Artificial Intelligence (CAAI), 2021
- Fellow, China Computer Federation, 2020
