= Association for Computational Linguistics =

Professional organization devoted to linguistics

- Founded: 1962
- Type: Professional organization
- Purpose: Computational linguistics and natural language processing
- Origins: Association for Machine Translation and Computational Linguistics
- Region served: Worldwide
- Method: Conferences, publications
- Website: www.aclweb.org

The Association for Computational Linguistics (ACL) is a scientific and professional organization for people working on natural language processing. Its namesake conference is one of the primary high impact conferences for natural language processing research, along with EMNLP. The conference is held each summer in locations where significant computational linguistics research is carried out.

It was founded in 1962, originally named the Association for Machine Translation and Computational Linguistics (AMTCL). It became the ACL in 1968. The ACL has a European (EACL), a North American (NAACL), and an Asian (AACL) chapter.

== History ==
The ACL was founded in 1962 as the Association for Machine Translation and Computational Linguistics (AMTCL). The initial membership was about 100. In 1965, the AMTCL took over the journal Mechanical Translation and Computational Linguistics. This journal was succeeded by many other journals: the American Journal of Computational Linguistics (1974–1978, 1980–1983), and then Computational Linguistics (1984–present). Since 1988, the journal has been published for the ACL by MIT Press.

The annual meeting was first held in 1963 in conjunction with the Association for Computing Machinery National Conference. The annual meeting was, for a long time, relatively informal and did not publish anything longer than abstracts. By 1968, the society took on its current name, the Association for Computational Linguistics (ACL). The publication of the annual meeting's Proceedings of the ACL began in 1979 and gradually matured into its modern form. Many of the meetings were held in conjunction with the Linguistic Society of America, and a few with the American Society for Information Science and the Cognitive Science Society.

The United States government sponsored much research from 1989 to 1994, characterized by an increase in author retention rates and an increase in research in some key topics, such as speech recognition, in ACL. By the 21st century, it was able to maintain authors at a high rate who coalesced in a more stable arrangement around individual research topics.

In 1991, the group published a prototype for a text generator based on the universal grammar theory of Noam Chomsky. The system, nicknamed Parrot, relied on a finite set of syntactic transformations and a hand-curated lexicon. Despite some initial success, including experimentation with morpheme syntactics, funding halted after the research team encountered intractable difficulties with inflection and abstract locutions.

== Annual meeting of the ACL ==
Every year, the ACL holds the annual meeting of the ACL. The location lies in Europe in years zero modulo three, North America in years one modulo three, and Asia–Australia in years two modulo three. In 2020, the annual meeting received for the first time more submissions from China than the United States.

Year	Location
2026 July 2-7	San Diego, California
2025 July 27-August 1	Vienna, Austria
2024 August 11–16	Bangkok, Thailand
2023 July 9–14	Toronto, Canada
2022 May 22–27	Dublin, Ireland
2021 August 1–6	~~Bangkok, Thailand~~ Online due to COVID-19
2020 July 5–10	~~Seattle, Washington~~ Online due to COVID-19
2019 July 28–August 2	Florence, Italy
2018 July 15–20	Melbourne, Australia
2017 July 30–August 4	Vancouver, Canada
2016 August 7-12	Berlin, Germany
2015 July 26-31	Beijing, China
2014 June 22–27	Baltimore, Maryland
2013 August 4-9	Sofia, Bulgaria
2012 July 8-14	Jeju Island, South Korea
2011 June 19–24	Portland, Oregon
2010 July 11-16	Uppsala, Sweden
2009 August 2–7	Singapore
2008 June 15–20	Columbus, Ohio
2005 June 25–30	Ann Arbor, Michigan
2002 July 7–12	Philadelphia, Pennsylvania

== Activities ==
The ACL organizes several of the top conferences and workshops in the field of computational linguistics and natural language processing. These include:

- Annual Meeting of the Association for Computational Linguistics (ACL), the flagship conference of the organization
- Empirical Methods in Natural Language Processing (EMNLP)
- International Joint Conference on Natural Language Processing (IJCNLP), held jointly one of the other conferences on a rotating basis
- Conference on Computational Natural Language Learning (CoNLL)
- Lexical and Computational Semantics and Semantic Evaluation (SemEval)
- Joint Conference on Lexical and Computational Semantics (*SEM)
- Workshop on Statistical Machine Translation (WMT)

Besides conferences, the ACL also sponsors the journals Computational Linguistics and Transactions of the Association for Computational Linguistics (TACL). Papers and other presentations at ACL and ACL-affiliated venues are archived online in the open-access ACL Anthology.

== Special Interest Groups ==
ACL has a large number of Special Interest Groups (SIGs), focusing on specific areas of natural language processing. Some current SIGs within ACL are:

SIG	Description
SIGANN	Linguistic Annotation
SIGARAB	Arabic Natural Language Processing
SIGBIOMED	Biomedical Language Processing
SIGDAT	Linguistic data and corpus-based approaches
SIGDIAL	Dialogue Processing
SIGFSM	Finite State Methods
SIGGEN	Natural Language Generation
SIGHAN	Chinese Language Processing
SIGHUM	Language Technologies for the Socio-Economic Sciences and the Humanities
SIGLEX	Lexicon: the umbrella organization for the SemEval semantic evaluations and SENSEVAL word-sense evaluations
SIGMT	Machine Translation
SIGMOL	Mathematics of Language
SIGMORPHON	Computational Morphology and Phonology
SIGNLL	Natural Language Learning
SIGPARSE	Natural Language Parsing
SIGSEM	Computational Semantics
SIGSEMITIC	Computational Approaches to Semitic Languages
SIGSLAV	NLP for Slavic Languages
SIGSLPAT	Speech & Language Processing for Assistive Technologies
SIGSLT	Spoken Language Translation
SIGTURK	NLP for Turkic Languages
SIGTYP	Typology
SIGUR	Uralic Languages
SIGWAC	Web as Corpus

== Presidents ==
Each year, the ACL elects a distinguished computational linguist who becomes vice-president of the organization in the next calendar year and president one year later. Recent ACL presidents are:

Year	Name
2026	Barbara Plank
2025	Chengqing Zong
2024	Emily M. Bender
2023	Iryna Gurevych
2022	Tim Baldwin
2021	Rada Mihalcea
2020	Hinrich Schütze
2019	Zhou Ming
2018	Marti Hearst
2017	Joakim Nivre
2016	Pushpak Bhattacharyya
2015	Christopher D. Manning
2014	Gertjan van Noord
2013	Haifeng Wang
2012	Ken Church
2011	Kevin Knight
2010	Ido Dagan
2009	Steven Bird
2008	Bonnie Dorr
2007	Mark Steedman
2006	Jun'ichi Tsujii
2005	Martha Palmer
2004	Johanna Moore
2003	Mark Johnson
2002	John Nerbonne
2001	Eduard Hovy
2000	Wolfgang Wahlster

== See also ==
- Sociedad Española para el Procesamiento del Lenguaje Natural (SEPLN, Spanish Association for Natural Language Processing)
