= Mexican International Conference on Artificial Intelligence =

Annual conference

- Abbreviation: MICAI
- Discipline: Artificial Intelligence

Publication details
- Publisher: Springer LNAI, IEEE CPS, journals.
- History: 2000–
- Frequency: annual

The Mexican International Conference on Artificial Intelligence (MICAI) is the name of an annual conference covering all areas of Artificial Intelligence (AI), held in Mexico. The first MICAI conference was held in 2000. The conference is attended every year by about two hundred of AI researchers and PhD students and 500−1000 local graduate students.

== Overview ==
MICAI is a high-level peer-reviewed international conference covering all areas of Artificial Intelligence. All editions of MICAI have been published in Springer Springer LNAI (N 1793, 2313, 2972, 3789, 4293, 4827, 5317, 5845, 6437–6438). Recent MICAI events (2006, 2007, 2008, 2009, and 2010) received over 300 submissions from over 40 countries each. The conference's scientific program includes keynote lectures, paper presentations, tutorials, panels, posters, and workshops. MICAI is organized by the Mexican Society for Artificial Intelligence (SMIA) in cooperation with various national institutions.

Their topics of interest focus on artificial intelligence, its potential applications, and related topics.

== Specific MICAI conferences ==
In the table below, the figures for the number of accepted papers and acceptance rate refer to the main proceedings volume and do not include supplemental proceedings volumes. The number of countries corresponds to submissions, not to accepted papers.

Year	City	Website	Proceedings	Submissions	Countries	Accepted	Acceptance rate
2000	Acapulco			163	17	60	37%
2002	Mérida			85	17	56	66%
2004	Mexico			254	19	94	38.2%
2005	Monterrey			423	43	120	28%
2006	Apizaco			447	42	123	26%
2007	Aguascalientes			485	31	115	23.9%
2008	Atizapán de Zaragoza			363	43	94	25.9%
2009	Guanajuato			215	21	63	29.3%
2010	Pachuca			301	34	126	42%
2011	Puebla			348	40	96	27.7%
2012	San Luis Potosí			224	28	77	34.3%
2013	Mexico City			284	45	85	29.9%
2014	Tuxtla Gutiérrez, Chiapas			350	46	87	24.8%

== Keynote speakers and program chairs ==
The following persons were honored by being selected by the organizers as keynote speakers or program chairs:

Year	Keynote speakers	Program Chairs
2000	Wolfgang Wahlster (DFKI and Saarland University), Hector Levesque (University of Toronto), Jay Liebowitz (George Washington University), Adolfo Guzmán Arenas (CIC), Jose Luis Marroquín (PEMEX), Bruce Buchanan (University of Pittsburgh)	Osvaldo Cairó, Luis Enrique Sucar, Francisco J. Cantú
2002	Pedro Larrañaga (University of the Basque Country), Stuart Russell (University of California), Francisco Cantú (ITESM), Edgar Sánchez (CINVESTAV), Jean-Claude Latombe (Stanford University)	Carlos Artemio Coello Coello, Álvaro de Albornoz Bueno, Luis Enrique Sucar, Osvaldo Cairó Battistutti
2004	Toby Walsh (University College Cork), Dispankar Dasgupta (University of Memphis), René Bañares (Oxford University), José Negrete Martínez (Universidad Veracruzana), Carlos Zozaya (Instituto Tecnológico Autónomo de México), Jorge X. Velasco (Instituto Mexicano del Petróleo)	Raúl Monroy Borja, Gustavo Arroyo-Figueroa, Luis Enrique Sucar, Humberto Sossa Azuela
2005	John McCarthy (Stanford University), Tom Mitchell (Carnegie Mellon University), Katsushi Ikeuchi (University of Tokyo), Erick Cantú-Paz (Lawrence Livermore National Laboratory), Jaime Simão Sichman (University of São Paulo), Piero P. Bonissone (General Electric Global Research)	Alexander Gelbukh, Álvaro de Albornoz Bueno
2006	Enrique Sucar (INAOE), Seth Hutchinson (University of Illinois at Urbana–Champaign), Carlos Artemio Coello Coello (CINVESTAV), Pedro Domingos (University of Washington), Ronald R. Yager (Iona College)	Alexander Gelbukh, Carlos Alberto Reyes García
2007	Fernando de Arriaga-Gómez (Polytechnic University of Madrid), Francisco Escolano (University of Alicante), Simon Haykin (McMaster University), Pablo Noriega (Institute for AI Research), Paolo Petta (University of Vienna), Boris Stilman (University of Colorado)	Alexander Gelbukh, Ángel Fernando Kuri Morales
2008	Gerardo Jiménez Sánchez (Johns Hopkins University), Stephanie Forrest (University of New Mexico), Francisco Cervántes-Pérez (UNAM), Simon Haykin (McMaster University), Steven M. La Valle (University of Illinois), Georg Gottlob (Oxford University)	Alexander Gelbukh, Eduardo F. Morales
2009	Patricia Melin (Institute of Technology, Tijuana), Ramón López Mántaras (CSIC), Josef Kittler (University of Surrey), José Luis Marroquín (PEMEX), Dieter Hutter (DFKI)	Arturo Hernández Aguirre, Raúl Monroy Borja, Carlos Alberto Reyes García
2010	Hector García-Molina (Stanford University), Witold Pedrycz (University of Alberta), De-Shuang Huang (Academy of Sciences), Raúl Monroy Borja (ITESM), Boris Stilman (University of Colorado at Denver), Claudia Manfredi (University di Firenze)	Grigori Sidorov, Arturo Hernández Aguirre
2011	Weiru Liu (Queen's University Belfast), Rada Mihalcea (University of North Texas), Jesús Favela (CICESE Research Center), Raúl Rojas (Freie Universität Berlin), Janusz Kacprzyk (Polish Academy of Sciences)	Ildar Batyrshin, Grigori Sidorov
2012	Ulises Cortés (Universitat Politècnica de Catalunya), Joydeep Ghosh (University of Texas), Jixin Ma (Greenwich College), Roy Maxion (Carnegie Mellon University), Grigori Sidorov (Instituto Politécnico Nacional), Ian Witten (University of Waikato)	Ildar Batyrshin, Miguel González Mendoza
2013	Ildar Batyrshin (Instituto Mexicano del Petróleo), Erik Cambria (National University of Singapore), Newton Howard (Massachusetts Institute of Technology), Maria Vargas-Vera (Universidad Adolfo Ibáñez), Andrei Voronkov (University of Manchester)	Félix Castro, Alexander Gelbukh, Miguel González Mendoza
2014	Oscar Castillo (Tijuana IT), Bonnie E. John (Thomas J. Watson Research Center), Bing Liu (University of Illinois), John Sowa (VivoMind Research), Vladimir Vapnik (NEC Laboratories)	Alexander Gelbukh, Félix Castro, Sofía Galicia Haro

== Awards ==
The authors of the following papers received the Best Paper Award:

Year	Place	Authors	Country	Paper
2000	-	Joby Varghese and Snehasis Mukhopadhyay	India	Multi-agent Adaptive Dynamic Programming
	-	Mauricio Osorio	Mexico	
	-	G. E. A. P. A. Batista, A. Carvalho, and M. C. Monard		Applying One-sided Selection to Unbalanced Datasets
	-	Alexander Gelbukh, Grigori Sidorov, and Igor A. Bolshakov	Mexico	Coherence Maintenance in Man-Machine Dialogue with Ellipsis (in the section of local papers)
	-	Alexander Gelbukh	Mexico	A Data Structure for Prefix Search under Access Locality Requirements and Its Application to Spelling Correction (in the section of local papers)
	-	Homero V. Rios, Emilio Aguirre et al.		Facial Expression Recognition and Modeling for Virtual Intelligent Tutoring Systems
	-	Armando García-Rodríguez, Ramón Martín Rodríguez-Dagnino, and Christos Douligeris		Extending the prediction horizon in dynamic bandwidth allocation for VBR video transport
	-			
	-			
2002	1			
	2			
	3			
2003	1	Nestor Velasco Bermeo, Miguel González Mendoza, Alexander García Castro and Irais Heras Dueñas.	Mexico	Towards the creation of Semantic Models based on Computer-Aided Designs
2004	1			
	2			
	3			
2005	1	Rafael Murrieta Cid, Alejandro Sarmiento, Teja Muppirala, Seth Hutchinson, Raul Monroy, Moises Alencastre Miranda, Lourdes Muñoz Gómez, and Ricardo Swain		A framework for Reactive Motion and Sensing Planning: a Crititcal Events-Based Approach
	2	Patrice Delmas, Georgy Gimel'farb, Jiang Liu, and John Morris		A Noise-Driven Paradigm for Solving the Stereo Correspondence Problem
	3	Jinghui Xiao, Bingquan Liu, Xiaolong Wang, and Bing Li		A Similarity-Based Approach to Data Sparseness Problem of the Chinese Language Modeling
2006	1	Luz Abril Torres-Méndez and Gregory Dudek		Statistics of Visual and Partial Depth Data for Mobile Robot Environment Modeling
	2	Antonio Camarena-Ibarrola and Edgar Chávez		On Musical Performances Identification, Entropy and String Matching
	3	Eduardo Rodriguez-Tello, Jin-Kao Hao, and Jose Torres-Jimenez		A Refined Evaluation Function for the MinLA Problem
2007	1	Mu Xiangyang, Zhang Taiyi and Zhou Yaatong	China	Scaling Kernels: A New Least Squares Support Vector Machine Kernel for Approximation
	2	Jean Bernard Hayet and Justus Piater	Mexico / Belgium	On-line Rectification of Sport Sequences with Moving Cameras
	3	Marcin Radlak and Ryszard Klempous	UK / Poland	SELDI-TOF-MS Pattern Analysis for Cancer Detection as a Base for Diagnostic Software
2008	1	Philippe Fournier-Viger, Roger Nkambou, and Engelbert Mephu Nguifo	Canada / France	A Knowledge Discovery Framework for Learning Task Models from User Interactions in Intelligent Tutoring Systems
	2	Yulia Ledeneva	Mexico	Effect of Preprocessing on Extractive Summarization with Maximal Frequent Sequences
	3	Giovanni Lizárraga, Arturo Hernández and Salvador Botello	Mexico	A Set of Test Cases for Performance Measures in Multiobjective Optimization
2009	1			
	2			
	3			
2010	1	Olga Kolesnikova and Alexander Gelbukh	Mexico	Supervised Machine Learning for Predicting the Meaning of Verb-Noun Combinations in Spanish
	2	Omar Montano-Rivas, Roy McCasland, Lucas Dixon and Alan Bundy	UK	Scheme-based Synthesis of Inductive Theories
	3			
2011	1	Sergio Jimenez Vargas and Alexander Gelbukh	Colombia / Mexico	SC Spectra: A New Soft Cardinality Approximation for Text Comparison
	2	Dmitrijs Rutko	Latvia	Fuzzified Tree Search in Teal Domain Games
	3	Francisco Madrigal, Jean-Bernard Hayet, and Mariano Rivera	Mexico	Multiple Target Tracking with Motion Priors
2012	1	Nestor Velasco Bermeo, Miguel González Mendoza, Alexander García Castro, Irais Heras Dueñas	Mexico / USA	Toward the Creation of Semantic Models Based on Computer-Aided Designs
	2	Hillel Romero-Monsivais, Eduardo Rodriguez-Tello, Gabriel Ramírez	Mexico	A New Branch and Bound Algorithm for the Cyclic Bandwidth Problem
	3	Gonzalo Nápoles, Isel Grau, Maikel León, Ricardo Grau	Cuba	Modelling, Aggregation, and Simulation of a Dynamic Biological System Through Fuzzy Cognitive Maps
2013	1	Sergio Rogelio Tinoco-Martínez, Felix Calderon, Carlos Lara-Alvarez, Jaime Carranza-Madrigal	Mexico	A Bayesian and Minimum Variance Technique for Arterial Lumen Segmentation in Ultrasound Imaging
	2	Angel Kuri-Morales, Edwin Aldana-Bobadilla	Mexico	The Best Genetic Algorithm I. A Comparative Study of Structurally Different Genetic Algorithms
		Angel Kuri-Morales, Edwin Aldana Bobadilla, Ignacio López-Peña	Mexico	The Best Genetic Algorithm II. A Comparative Study of Structurally Different Genetic Algorithms
	3	Melanie Neunerdt, Michael Reyer, Rudolf Mathar	Germany	A POS Tagger for Social Media Texts Trained on Web Comments

== See also ==
- The list of computer science conferences contains other academic conferences in computer science.
