= International Conference on Computational Linguistics and Intelligent Text Processing =

- Abbreviation: CICLing
- Discipline: Computational Linguistics, Natural Language Processing, Human Language Technologies

Publication details
- Publisher: Springer LNCS
- History: 2000–
- Frequency: annual

CICLing (International Conference on Computational Linguistics and Intelligent Text Processing; before 2017 known under the name International Conference on Intelligent Text Processing and Computational Linguistics) is an annual conference on computational linguistics (CL) and natural language processing (NLP). The first CICLing conference was held in 2000 in Mexico City. The conference is attended by one to two hundred of NLP and CL researchers and students every year. As of 2017, it is ranked within the top 20 sources (conferences and journals) on computational linguistics by Google Scholar. Past CICLing conferences have been held in Mexico, Korea, Israel, Romania, Japan, India, Greece, Nepal, Egypt, Turkey, Hungary, and Vietnam; the 2019 event was held in France.

== Overview ==
CICLing is a series of annual international conferences devoted to computational linguistics (CL), natural language processing (NLP), human language technologies (HLT), natural-language human-computer interaction (HCI), as well as speech processing and speech recognition (SR).

Their topics of interest include, but are not limited to: text processing, computational morphology, tagging, stemming, syntactic analysis, parsing and shallow parsing, chunking, recognizing textual entailment, ambiguity resolution, semantic analysis, pragmatics, lexicon, lexical resources, dictionaries and machine-readable dictionaries (MRD), grammar, anaphora resolution, word sense disambiguation (WSD), machine translation (MT), information retrieval (IR), information extraction (IE), document handling, document classification and text classification, text summarization, text mining (TM), opinion mining, sentiment analysis, plagiarism detection, and spell checking (spelling).

CICLing series was founded in 2000 by Alexander Gelbukh. The acronym "CICLing" refers to "Conference on Intelligent text processing and Computational Linguistics", the name used before 2017.

Almost all CICLing events have been endorsed by the Association for Computational Linguistics.

Unlike some other conferences on computational linguistics and natural language processing, such as those run by the Association for Computational Linguistics, CICLing does not release its main proceedings as Open Access, publishing them instead with Springer; however, most of its complementary proceedings, published as special issues of journals, are released as Open Access; in addition, Springer allows the authors to make their papers available via their own webpages.

== Past CICLing Conferences ==
In the table below, the figures for the number of accepted papers and acceptance rate refer to the main proceedings volume and do not include supplemental proceedings volumes. The number of countries corresponds to submissions, not to accepted papers.

Year	Country	City	Website	Proceedings	Submissions	Countries	Accepted	Acceptance Rate	Notes
2000	Mexico	Mexico City			34	10	32	94.1	
2001	Mexico	Mexico City			72	10	53	73.6	First time published in LNCS
2002	Mexico	Mexico City			67	19	48	71.6	
2003	Mexico	Mexico City			92	23	67	72.8	
2004	Korea	Seoul			129	21	74	57.4	
2005	Mexico	Mexico City			151	26	88	58.3	
2006	Mexico	Mexico City			176	37	59	33.5	
2007	Mexico	Mexico City			179	34	53	29.6	
2008	Israel	Haifa			204	39	52	25.5	
2009	Mexico	Mexico City			167	40	44	26.3	
2010	Romania	Iași			271	47	61	23.0	
2011	Japan	Tokyo			298	48	74	24.8	
2012	India	New Delhi			307	46	88	28.6	
2013	Greece	Samos			354	55	87	24.6	
2014	Nepal	Kathmandu			300	57	85	28.3	
2015	Egypt	Cairo			329	62	95	28.9	
2016	Turkey	Konya			298	54	89	29.8	In memoriam of Adam Kilgarriff
2017	Hungary	Budapest			356	60	86	24.2	
2018	Vietnam	Hanoi							
2019	France	La Rochelle							Forthcoming

== Keynote Speakers and Local Organizing Committee Chairs ==
The table lists, by year, experts that have given keynote addresses at past CICLing conferences, as well as the chairs of the Local Organizing Committee.

Year	Keynote Speakers	Local Chair
2000	Richard Kittredge, Igor Mel'čuk	Alexander Gelbukh
2001	Graeme Hirst, Sylvain Kahane	Alexander Gelbukh
2002	Ruslan Mitkov, Ivan Sag, Yorick Wilks	Alexander Gelbukh
2003	Eric Brill, Aravind Joshi, Adam Kilgarriff, Ted Pedersen	Alexander Gelbukh
2004	Ricardo Baeza-Yates, Nick Campbell, Martin Kay, Philip Resnik	SangYong Han
2005	Christian Boitet, Kevin Knight, Daniel Marcu, Ellen Riloff	Alexander Gelbukh
2006	Eduard Hovy, Nancy Ide, Rada Mihalcea	Alexander Gelbukh
2007	Gregory Grefenstette, Kathleen McKeown, Raymond Mooney	Alexander Gelbukh
2008	Ido Dagan, Eva Hajičová, Alon Lavie, Kemal Oflazer	Shuly Wintner
2009	Jill Burstein, Ken Church, Dekang Lin, Bernardo Magnini	Alexander Gelbukh
2010	James Pustejovsky, Shuly Wintner	Corina Forăscu
2011	Chris Manning, Diana McCarthy, Jun'ichi Tsujii, Hans Uszkoreit	Yasunari Harada
2012	Srinivas Bangalore, John A. Carroll, Marie-Francine Moens, Salim Roukos	Niladri Chatterjee
2013	Sophia Ananiadou, Walter Daelemans, Roberto Navigli, Michael Thelwall	Efstathios Stamatatos
2014	Jerry Hobbs, Bing Liu, Suresh Manandhar, Johanna Moore	Sagun Dhakhwa
2015	Erik Cambria, Mona Talat Diab, Lauri Karttunen, Joakim Nivre	Samhaa R. El-Beltagy
2016	Pascale Fung, Tomas Mikolov, Simone Teufel, Piek Vossen	Hatem Haddad
2017	Marco Baroni, Iryna Gurevych, Björn Schuller, Hinrich Schütze	Attila Novák
2018	Pushpak Bhattacharyya, Jing Jiang, Soujanya Poria, Fabrizio Sebastiani	Antoine Doucet
2019		Antoine Doucet

== See also ==
- The list of computer science conferences contains other academic conferences in computer science.
- The list of linguistics conferences contains other academic conferences in linguistics.
