= August Leidl =

German church historian (1933–1994)

August Leidl (19 January 1933 in Burghausen, Germany – 23 July 1994) was a Passau church historian and university professor. From 1969 to 1994, he was also director of the Institute for East Bavarian Home Research.

Leidl was born on 19 January 1933 in Burghausen, where he also graduated from high school in 1952. In the same year, he enrolled in the Philosophical-Theological University Passau and entered the priestly seminary St. Stephan; In June 1958, he received the priestly ordination. Two years later, he began studying at LMU Munich, promoted a dissertation in 1964, and submitted his Habilitationsschrift only four years later. In October 1968, he took over the chair of church history at the Philosophical-Theological University Passau, and was appointed professor the following year. Leidl was vice president of the university from 1976 to 1978, which was incorporated into the newly founded University of Passau in 1978. From 1978 to 1981, he was the first dean of the Catholic Theological Faculty.

In 1969, Leidl was first appointed jointly with Benno Hubensteiner, director of the Institute for East Bavarian Home Research. In 1973, he was confirmed as the sole director of the Bavarian Ministry of Culture. Also in 1969, he was entrusted with the management of the Episcopal Archives, whose resettlement from the residence to the Luragogasse, and thus its modernization, he was able to advance. Already in 1979, he received the Cultural Honorary Letter of the City of Passau as well as the appointment to the papal honorary prelate. In 1980, Leidl was the head of one of the most modern church archives of the Federal Republic (at the same time as the most modern church archives in Bavaria) with the completion of the relocation of the episcopal archive. In 1982, he was even elected as the German chairman of the archives of the Catholic Church. In 1992, however, he had to withdraw from the position of Passau diocesan archives' director, due to his advanced illness. August Leidl died on 23 July 1994 at the age of 61 and is buried in Schalding on the right bank of the Danube.
