= Neural network (disambiguation) =

A neural network is an interconnected population of neurons:

- Neural network (biology), a network of real neurons in the brain
- Neural network (machine learning), a network of mathematical neurons used in computation

Neural network or Neural Networks may also refer to:

- Neural Networks (journal), a peer-reviewed scientific journal
- Neural Networks: A Comprehensive Foundation, a 1999 book by Simon Haykin
- Neural Networks. A Systematic Introduction, a 1996 book by Raúl Rojas
