= Transformers (sculptures) =

Metal sculptures in Washington, D.C.

Coordinates: 38.905812°N 77.070651°W

The sculptures depicting Bumblebee and Barricade

Transformers are two metal sculptures depicting characters from the Transformers media franchise that were installed outside of the Georgetown home of Newton Howard, a brain and cognitive scientist who is a professor at Georgetown University in Washington, D.C. The two-ton (1,814 kg) sculptures were made from recycled motorcycle and car parts and depict Bumblebee and Barricade. They were installed in January 2021, leading to a mixed reaction from locals and legal challenges from the Old Georgetown Board and local Advisory Neighborhood Commission.

Howard's work with artificial intelligence and implant prosthetic technology inspired him to have the sculptures commissioned by an unnamed artist. Additional sculptures are inside his house, located on Prospect Street NW in the Georgetown Historic District. Due to regulations in historic districts and overseeing public and private designs by the Old Georgetown Board, Howard was told to remove them. He was eventually granted permission to have the sculptures displayed temporarily, but after the six-month permit ended, Howard did not remove them. Since then, he has continued an expensive legal battle to keep the sculptures outside his house. Howard's defenders include Peter Cullen and Dan Gilvezan, the voice actors of Optimus Prime and Bumblebee in the 1980s Transformers animated series.

== History ==
=== Installation ===
In January 2021 brain and cognitive scientist Newton Howard, who specializes in artificial intelligence, replaced two planter boxes with two metal sculptures in front of his townhouse at 3614 Prospect Street NW in the Georgetown neighborhood of Washington, D.C. The two-ton (1,814 kg) sculptures depict Bumblebee and Barricade, characters from the Transformers media franchise, and measure approximately 10 feet (3 m) tall. The sculptures cost more than $25,000 each and were made in Taiwan. Howard purchased the townhouse in mid-2020 for $3.75 million after he left Oxford University's Computational Neuroscience Laboratory and began working as a professor at nearby Georgetown University. He later purchased an adjoining townhouse for $4.8 million and would often showcase his cars outside his residence, including a McLaren 720S, a Porsche Carrera GT, and a Porsche 918 Spyder, as well as a MRAP tank and a small airplane. Due to complaints from neighbors, Howard stopped displaying these items.

Howard has many robots inside his house and other Transformers sculptures made of recycled motorcycle and car parts, the same material used for the Barricade and Bumblebee sculptures outside. He commissioned an unnamed artist to create the Transformers sculptures to display in his office and home. Howard stated why he chose Transformers: "They represent the coalition of men and machine, working in harmony but as distinct entities. We create robotic and prosthetic arms and all of these things to compensate for damage. That does not make us robots. There are two distinct structures and creations, you know? Or at least that's what I believe, while there are others who believe robots will take over the world."

In an interview with Slate magazine Newton said the sculptures were commissioned "because the Transformers represent human and machine living in harmony, if you will." When the journalist asked, "So that's why you have Autobots, not Decepticons", Newton replied, "Oh, so you understand!" Howard's interest in Transformers is also based on his work with the KIWI chip, which is a "1.2 by 2.2 millimeter implant prosthetic that interfaces with the brain in various regions you implant it in," and can potentially help people living with neurodegenerative disorders. According to Howard, "The Transformers are machines that have the core logic of a human. The KIWI chip has the core logic of a machine, inside a human."

=== Reaction ===
==== Legal challenges ====
According to Howard, the immediate reaction from the public after the sculptures were installed was positive. People would pose for photos and leave notes in his mailbox or on his door. The reaction from local officials was different. A city inspector told Howard he would need a public space permit for the sculptures since the property line ends at the façade of his house along the sidewalk. Howard noted the previous planter boxes were displayed on brick platforms attached to the house and had been there for many years.

In March 2021, the local Advisory Neighborhood Commission, ANC 2E, unanimously rejected Howard's request for a permit. ANC officials said they did not reject the request based on the sculptures' aesthetic but rather that Howard needed approval from the Old Georgetown Board, which the United States Commission of Fine Arts (CFA) appoints to regulate public and private designs in the Georgetown Historic District. The ANC commissioner that represents the area of Prospect Street NW where Howard's home is located said, "It's one of those funny things that people think it's their own property but it's actually public space...It needs to be reviewed by the Old Georgetown Board. Procedurally this did not happen in the right order." Howard responded that if the Old Georgetown Board denied his permit, he would take up the issue in court because it was an issue of free expression and that it was helping the environment because the sculptures are made of recycled material.

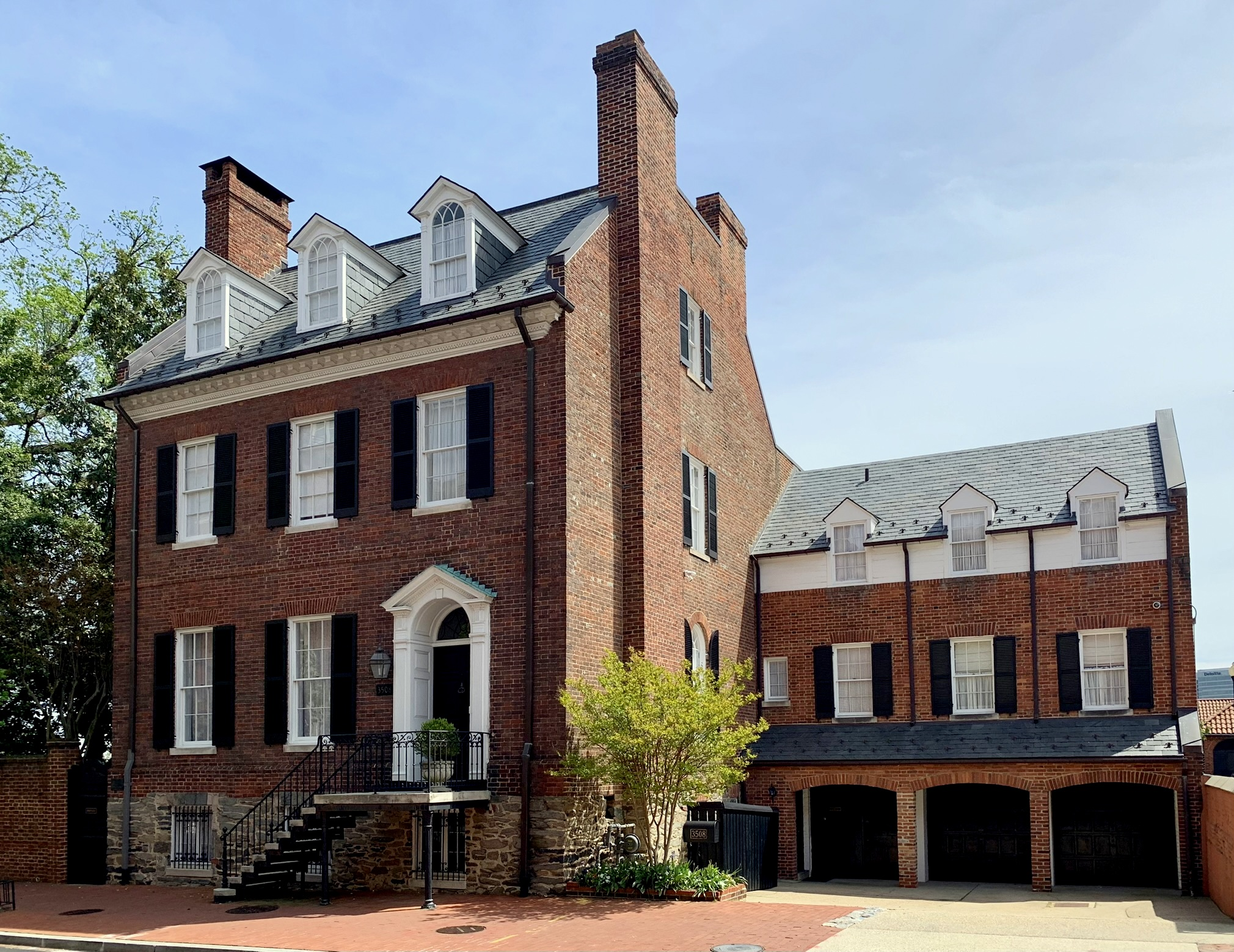
Some neighbors and local groups said the sculptures did not fit in with the historic nature of the neighborhood. Other buildings near Howard's house include Halcyon House, Quality Hill, and Prospect House (pictured).

Government officials were not the only ones that had a negative reaction to the sculptures. Some of Howard's neighbors, including a co-founder of the Prospect Street Citizens Association who lives two doors down from Howard, said installing the sculptures was a "selfish and unilateral act,' could potentially harm property values of neighboring homes, and that the people who were posing for photos were not social distancing during the COVID-19 pandemic.

Former NBC News correspondent Luke Russert, who lives next door to Howard, spoke out against the sculptures at the ANC meeting. Russert said it was a safety hazard that people would stop and take photos, including those who would double-park to get out of their vehicles for photos. He also said letting the sculptures stay could create a precedent: "What's to stop someone from putting up a statue of Joseph Stalin and saying, 'Well this is provocative, it's art, it speaks to me?'" Howard responded to his neighbors' complaints that they were acting entitled.

Some people and organizations spoke out for and against the sculptures at the meeting before the Old Georgetown Board. Stephen duPont, an architect and zoning expert hired by Howard, defended the sculptures citing their artistic value. There were also neighborhood children who asked the board to keep it. The Citizens Association of Georgetown and Prospect Street Citizens Association argued the sculptures were out of place in the historic district and would create a precedent whereby homeowners could display various objects without input. The board ruled that they would decline a permit for Howard to display the sculptures due to regulations concerning historic districts. Board members said they would be open to granting a permit for a temporary installation that would last six to eight months. The board later sent an email to Howard granting him a permit to have the sculptures remain for six months, starting from the day he submitted a request, April 16.

By late 2021, Howard said the sculptures were becoming more accepted amongst some locals and that they continued to be popular with people posing for Instagram photos. He also said the CFA was working with him to explore the installation of 16 other Transformers sculptures throughout the city, a project funded by the Howard Brain Sciences Foundation. Despite the six-month temporary permit that began in April 2021, the sculptures continued to be displayed outside Howard's house in 2023. Howard later moved the smaller 6-foot (1.8 m) Optimus Prime sculpture that was displayed outside his house onto his roof and replaced it with the current 10-foot Barricade sculpture.

At an ANC meeting in April 2023, members of the Prospect Street Citizens Association complained the sculptures attracted motorcycle gangs, could topple during an earthquake, and that children could be injured if they climbed on top of them. Defending the artworks, the ANC commissioner representing Georgetown students said "All the university students who live across the street...consider these Transformers to be of profound public importance." The ANC denied Howard's request for a permit. The following week the Old Georgetown Board also denied a request for the sculptures to remain displayed with the chair saying "We hope that these statues will disappear in the not-too-distant future." The board also told Howard he would need a permit for the sculpture on his roof since it was visible from the street.

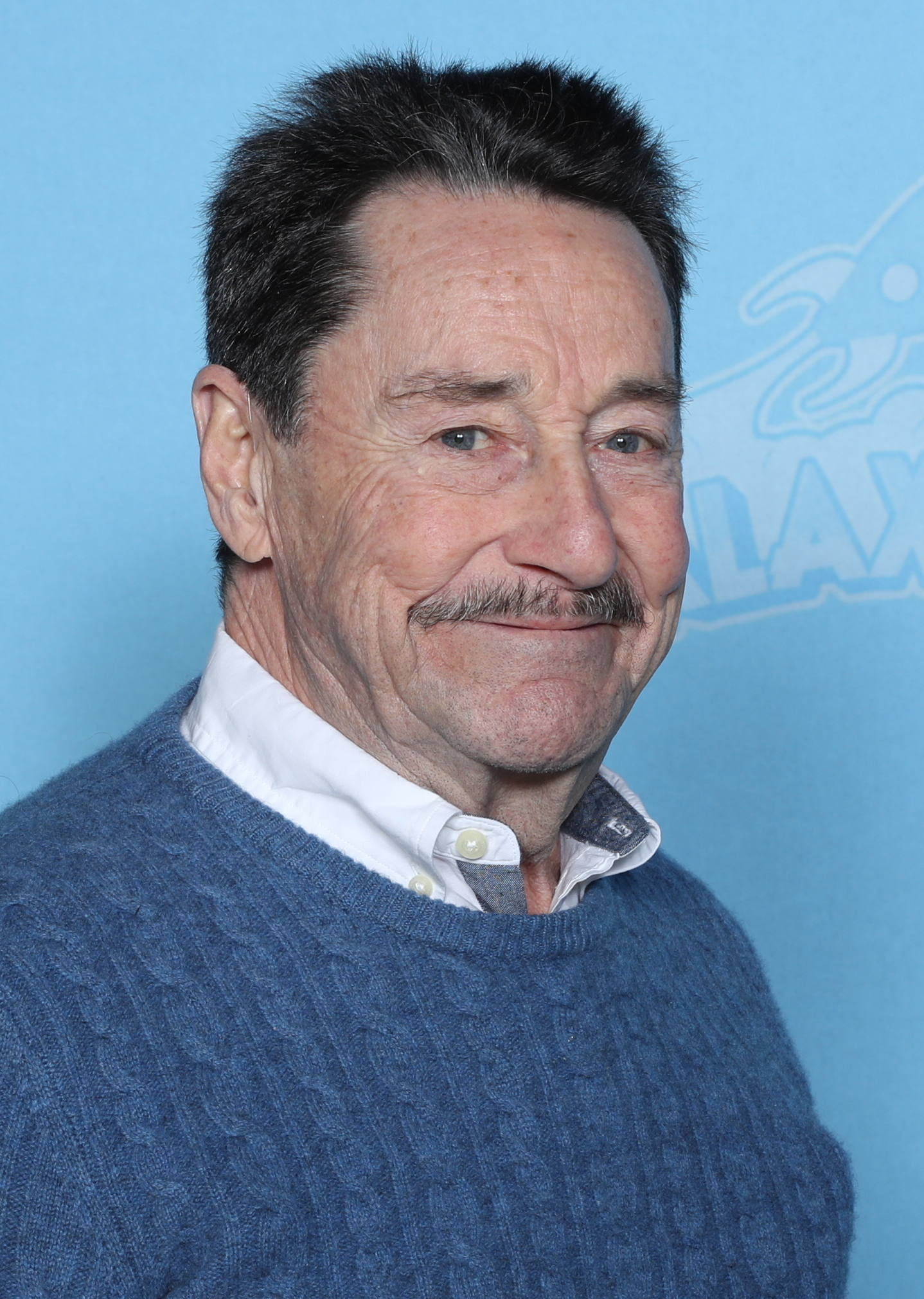
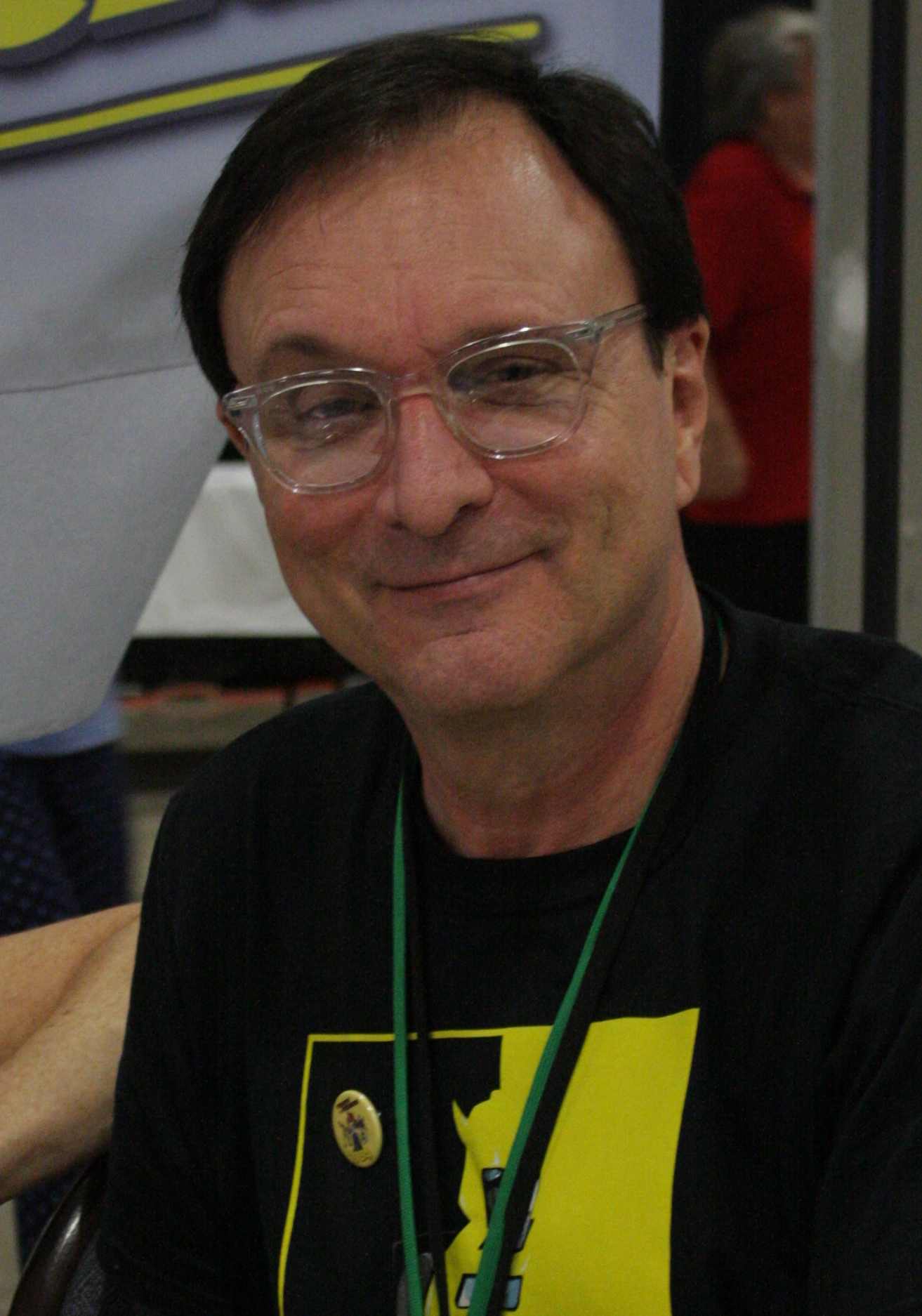
Peter Cullen and Dan Gilvezan provided testimonies in 2023 defending the sculptures at a D.C. Public Space Committee hearing.

In May 2023, Peter Cullen and Dan Gilvezan, who were the voices of Optimus Prime and Bumblebee in the 1980s animated series, provided testimonies defending the sculptures at a D.C. Public Space Committee hearing. In a pre-recorded message, Cullen introduced himself before changing his voice, saying "I, Optimus Prime, pale to [Howard's] heroism. Georgetown should be proud to share his visions of transformation. Peace is the right of all sentient beings. Autobots, humans, let us transform until all are one!" Voiced as Bumblebee, Gilvezan stated:

"It seems fitting to me that we heroes who fight every day for freedom and liberty belong in a place so closely associated with those very qualities, the capital of this great country. Now, I understand some people think that these statues don't fit the character of the neighborhood, that they stand out like a sore thumb. Well, first, I resent being compared to a sore thumb. A healthy, well-functioning thumb, maybe, but a sore thumb? It's also been said that they don't reflect the historic nature of the district. Are you kidding me? We Autobots have been around for millennia. You want to talk historic? We're prehistoric."

In addition to Cullen and Gilvezan, the sculptures were defended by actress Emily Swallow, D.C. shadow senator Paul Strauss, acting as his attorney, and some local residents. The five-person committee still denied Howard's permit. Howard plans to continue fighting to keep the sculptures outside his home. According to Howard, he has spent almost $100,000 in his attempts to keep the sculptures, and is willing to spend more if necessary. His legal battle has attracted significant attention in local media, but also the attention of Paramount Pictures officials, who invited him to the local premiere of Transformers: Rise of the Beasts.

==== Defenders ====
In an opinion piece for The Washington Post, a Georgetown University student criticized Russert's analogy of a Stalin statue since Stalin represented dictatorship while Transformers are the "embodiment of the typical American industrious extravagance — and the endless life-changing possibilities through which technology can help us 'restore human dignity.'" Dan Kois of Slate said the sculptures "deliver grandeur and whimsy to the modern cityscape,' that they were "spectacular," and that they are "lovingly crafted, immense, and tacky." A neighborhood news site pointed out that Howard's house and the adjoining houses were not older buildings, like most in the neighborhood, but were built in the mid-20th century and designed to mimic the Federal architecture style, thus not harming the historic nature of the neighborhood.

== See also ==
- List of public art in Washington, D.C., Ward 2
- Outdoor sculpture in Washington, D.C.
