= Finelli =

Finelli is an Italian surname. Notable people with the surname include:

- Cynthia Finelli, American engineering educator
- Giuliano Finelli (1601–1653), Italian sculptor
- Renzo Finelli (born 1945), Italian middle distance runner

== See also ==
- Pinelli
