= Cynthia Finelli =

American engineering educator

Cynthia Jean Finelli
- Education: Michigan (Ph.D., M.S., B.S.)
- Scientific career
- Fields: Electrical Engineering
- Workplaces: Michigan (2003–); General Motors Institute of Technology (1992–2003)
- Thesis: A signal modeling method for analysis of cardiac arrhythmias in intraventricular electrograms (1993)
- Doctoral advisor: Janice Jenkins

Cynthia Jean Finelli is an American engineering educator whose research includes publications on evidence-based education, on the effects of neurodiversity on engineering education, on the evaluation of group work, and on academic dishonesty. She is a professor of electrical engineering and computer science at the University of Michigan, where she also holds a courtesy appointment in the Department of Education.

== Education and career ==
Finelli studied electrical engineering at the University of Michigan, earning a bachelor's degree in 1988, a master's degree in 1989, and a Ph.D. in 1993 for research in electrocardiography.

She joined the General Motors Institute of Technology (now Kettering University) as an instructor in 1992, and became a regular-rank faculty member there in 1993. It was through her position at GMI, a teaching school, that her interests shifted from electrical engineering to engineering education. She became founding director of the Center for Excellence in Teaching and Learning in 2000, and in 2002 she was named Richard L. Terrell Professor for Excellence in Teaching.

She returned to the University of Michigan in 2003, initially as the founding director of the Center for Research on Learning and Teaching in Engineering, and Coordinator of Engineering Education. From 2004 to 2010 she also held part-time appointments in the Department of Engineering Education. She returned to the regular faculty ranks in 2015 as an associate professor in the Department of Electrical Engineering & Computer Science and (by courtesy) in the Department of Education, and in 2019 was promoted to full professor.

== Recognition ==
Finelli became a Fellow of the American Society for Engineering Education in 2013. She was named an IEEE Fellow in 2021, "for leadership and scholarship in engineering education".

In 2022, the University of Michigan College of Engineering gave Finelli their Trudy Huebner Service Excellence Award, "for her decades of leadership and vision in the area of engineering education and her commitment to serving the academic community".
