= Stephanie Schuckers =

American electrical engineer and bioengineer

Stephanie A. C. Schuckers (née Caswell) is an American electrical engineer and bioengineer specializing in biomedical signal processing, especially focusing on liveness testing for biometrics, with additional research on non-invasive biomedical monitoring. She is a Bank of America Distinguished Professor in the Department of Computing and Informatics at the University of North Carolina at Charlotte.

== Education and career ==
Schuckers majored in electrical engineering at the University of Iowa, graduating in 1992. She went to the University of Michigan for graduate study in electrical engineering, earning a master's degree in 1994 and completing her Ph.D. in 1997. Her dissertation, Reliable Signal Detection of Ventricular Fibrillation in Intracardiac Electrograms for Precision of Therapeutic Choice, was supervised by Janice Jenkins.

She became an assistant professor of computer science and electrical engineering at West Virginia University in 1997. In 2001 she dropped to part-time academic work and began work in the biometric industry, and in 2002 she began work as a research associate professor at Clarkson University, splitting her time with West Virginia University as a research assistant professor there. In 2004 she became a regular-rank associate professor at Clarkson University. In 2005 she founded NexID Biometrics, a startup that was sold in 2017. In 2007 she returned to full-time academic work at Clarkson. She was promoted to full professor in 2012, and named as the Paynter-Krigman Endowed Professor in Engineering Science in 2015.

== Recognition ==
Schuckers was one of five 2017 recipients of the Women in Biometrics Awards of the Security Industry Association. She was elected as an IEEE Fellow in 2023, "for contributions in biometric recognition systems".
