= UWRF ZISU Partnership =

The University of Wisconsin-River Falls (River Falls, Wisconsin) and Zhejiang International Studies University (Hangzhou, China) have enjoyed a partnership dating back to the 1980s. In 2013 the partnership created a new program for elementary education majors who wish to have an international study abroad experience. The program is a 1+1+2 where the first, third, and fourth years are spent at the students’ primary institution while the second year is spent at the partner university.

== History ==
UWRF and ZISU first partnered in the 1980s for study abroad. UWRF launched a study abroad center at ZISU in 2012—called “experience China”—which built upon prior experiences between the two schools.

The first cohort of 22 elementary education majors from ZISU enrolled in the Fall 2013 semester at UWRF. UWRF has sought to give many students the opportunity to study abroad and has been actively seeking partnerships in foreign countries to facilitate these experiences.

In Fall 2013 UWRF had 150 international students enrolled from 19 countries—the highest number in school history.

== About 1+1+2 ==
One of UWRF's strategic initiatives was to have 147 international students enroll by the fall semester of 2017. That goal was exceeded with the 1+1+2 program which began in 2013. The ZISU students enroll in 16 credits per semester and also visit the nearby elementary schools for an extensive field experience. The ZISU students regularly visit the local elementary schools and help out in the classroom. The children are also taught about Chinese culture and the ZISU students are able to answer questions.

One of the goals of the partnership, as well as 'experience China' is to make UWRF students more competitive in the teaching job market.
