= Newton Howard =

U.S. brain and cognitive scientist

Newton Howard is a brain and cognitive scientist, the former founder and director of the MIT Mind Machine Project at the Massachusetts Institute of Technology (MIT). He is a former professor of computational neurology and functional neurosurgery at Georgetown University. He is a member of the Congregation of Oxford and was a professor at the University of Oxford, where he directed the Oxford Computational Neuroscience Laboratory. He is also the founder and former director of MIT's Synthetic Intelligence Lab, the founder and the Vic Chairman of the Center for Advanced Defense Studies and the chairman of the Brain Sciences Foundation. Professor Howard is also a senior fellow at the John Radcliffe Hospital at Oxford, a senior scientist at INSERM in Paris and a P.A.H. at the CHU Hospital in Martinique.

His research areas include Quantum Biology , Cognition Memory, Trauma, Machine Learning, Comprehensive Brain Modeling, Natural Language Processing, Nanotech, Medical Devices and Artificial Intelligence.

== Education and career ==
Howard earned his B.A. from Concordia University Ann Arbor and an M.A. in Technology from Eastern Michigan University. He went on to study at MIT and at the University of Oxford where, as a graduate member of the Faculty of Mathematical Sciences, he proposed the Theory of Intention Awareness (IA). He also received a Doctorate in Cognitive Informatics and Mathematics from the University of Paris-Sorbonne, where he was also awarded a Habilitation a Diriger des Recherches for his work on the Physics of Cognition (PoC).

Howard is an author and national security advisor to several U.S. Government organizations and his work has contributed to more than 30 U.S. patents and over 90 publications. In 2009, he founded the Brain Sciences Foundation (BSF), a nonprofit 501(c)3 organization with the goal of improving the quality of life for those suffering from neurological disorders.

== Research ==
Howard is known for his Theory of Intention Awareness (IA), which provides a possible model for explaining volition in human intelligence, recursively throughout all layers of biological organization. He next developed the Mood State Indicator (MSI) a machine learning system capable of predicting emotional states by modeling the mental processes involved in human speech and writing. The Language Axiological Input/Output system (LXIO) was built upon this MSI framework and found to be capable of detecting both sentiment and cognitive states by parsing sentences into words, then processing each through time orientation, contextual-prediction and subsequent modules, before computing each word's contextual and grammatical function with a Mind Default Axiology. The key significance of LXIO was its ability to incorporate conscious thought and bodily expression (linguistic or otherwise) into a uniform code schema.

In 2012, Howard published the Fundamental Code Unit (FCU) theory, which uses unitary mathematics (ON/OFF +/-) to correlate networks of neurophysiological processes to higher order function. In 2013, he proposed the Brain Code (BC) theory, a methodology for using the FCU to map entire circuits of neurological activity to behavior and response, effectively decoding the language of the brain.

In 2014, he hypothesized a functional endogenous optical network within the brain, mediated by neuropsin (OPN5). This self-regulating cycle of photon-mediated events in the neocortex involves sequential interactions among 3 mitochondrial sources of endogenously generated photons during periods of increased neural spiking activity: (a) near-UV photons (~380 nm), a free radical reaction byproduct; (b) blue photons (~470 nm) emitted by NAD(P)H upon absorption of near-UV photons; and (c) green photons (~530 nm) generated by NAD(P)H oxidases, upon NAD(P)H-generated blue photon absorption. The bistable nature of this nanoscale quantum process provides evidence that an on/off (UNARY +/-) coding system exists at the most fundamental level of brain operation.

== Transformers sculptures ==
In 2021 Howard installed two-ton (1,814 kg) sculptures depicting Bumblebee and Optimus Prime, characters from the Transformers media franchise, outside of his home in the Georgetown neighborhood of Washington, D.C. His inspiration for the sculptures came from his work with artificial intelligence and "because the Transformers represent human and machine living in harmony, if you will." The reaction from locals was mixed and he ran into legal issues with local government officials. He was eventually granted permission to keep the statues installed for a period of six months, but they remained after that time.

== Selected works ==
=== Books ===
- Howard, N., Argamon, S. (Eds.) (2009). Computational Methods For Counterterrorism. Berlin: Springer-Verlag.

=== Most-cited journal articles ===
- Hussain, A., Cambria, E., Schuller, B., Howard, N. (2014). Affective Neural Networks and Cognitive Learning Systems for Big Data Analysis, Neural Networks, Special Issue, 58, 1–3.
- Cambria, E., Howard, N., Song, Y. & Wang, H. (2014). Semantic Multidimensional Scaling for Open Domain Sentiment Analysis. IEEE Intelligent Systems, 29 March/April.
- Poria, S., Agarwal, Basant., Gelbukh, A., Hussain, A., Howard, N. (2014) Dependency-Based Semantic Parsing for Concept-Level Text Analysis. Computational Linguistics and Intelligent Text Processing. Lecture Notes in Computer Science, 8403, 113–127
- Howard, N. (2013). The Twin Hypotheses: Brain Code and the Fundamental Code Unit: Towards Understanding the Computational Primitive Elements of Cortical Computing. Lecture Notes in Artificial Intelligence, MICAI, November 24–30, 2013, Mexico City, Mexico.
- Howard, N., Bergmann, J. & Stein, J. (2013). Combined Modality of the Brain Code Approach for Early Detection and the Long-term Monitoring of Neurodegenerative Processes. Frontiers Special Issue INCF Course Imaging the Brain at Different Scales.
- Howard, N. (2013). Approach Towards a Natural Language Analysis for Diagnosing Mood Disorders and Comorbid Conditions. Lecture Notes in Computer Science, MICAI, November 24–30, 2013, Mexico City, Mexico.
- Howard, N. (2012). Brain Language: The Fundamental Code Unit. The Brain Sciences Journal, 1(1), 4–45.
- Howard, N. (2012). Energy Paradox of the Brain. The Brain Sciences Journal, 1(1), 46–61.
- Howard, N., Lieberman, H. (2012). BrainSpace: Automated Brain Understanding and Machine Constructed Analytics in Neuroscience. The Brain Sciences Journal, 1(1), 85–97.
- Howard, N., Guidere, M. (2012). LXIO The Mood Detection Robopsych. The Brain Sciences Journal, 1(1), 98–109.
- Howard, N. & Bergmann, J. (2012). Combining Computational Neuroscience and Body Sensor Networks to Investigate Alzheimer's Disease. Journal of Functional Neurology, Rehabilitation and Ergonomics, 2(1), 29–38
- Howard, N., Kanareykin, S. (2012) Transcranial Ultrasound Application Methods: Low-frequency ultrasound as a treatment for brain dysfunction. The Brain Sciences Journal, 1(1), 110–124.
- Howard, N. (1999) The Logic of Uncertainty and Situational Understanding. Published by Center for Advanced Defense Studies (CADS)/Institute for the Mathematical Complexity & Cognition (MC) Centre de Recherche en Informatique, Université Paris Sorbonne
