= Roy Maxion =

American computer scientist

Roy A. Maxion is a research professor at School of Computer Science of Carnegie Mellon University. His research interests include biometrics, keystroke dynamics, and software reliability. His h-index is 30.

== Editorial board ==
- International Journal of Biometrics, editorial board member
- IEEE Security and Privacy, associate editor

== Awards ==
- 2008, IEEE Fellow
- 2019, IEEE/Dependable Systems and Networks Test of Time Award
