= Björn Schuller =

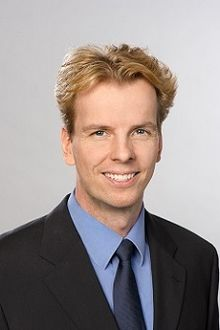
Björn Schuller (2016)

Björn Wolfgang Schuller (born April 18, 1975) is a scientist of electrical engineering, information technology and computer science as well as entrepreneur. He is professor of artificial intelligence at Imperial College London., UK, and holds the chair of embedded intelligence for healthcare and wellbeing at the University of Augsburg in Germany. He was a university professor and holder of the chair of complex and intelligent systems at the University of Passau in Germany. He is also co-founder and managing director as well as the current chief scientific officer (CSO) of audEERING GmbH, Germany, as well as permanent visiting professor at the Harbin Institute of Technology in the People's Republic of China and associate of CISA at the University of Geneva in French-speaking Switzerland.

== Career ==
Schuller was born in 1975 in Munich, Germany. After graduation in 1994, he received his diploma in 1999, a doctorate in 2006, and the state doctorate (habilitation) in the field of signal processing and machine intelligence as well as adjunct teaching professor in 2012—each in electrical engineering and information technology at the Technical University of Munich (TUM), Germany. There, he headed as scientific assistant, academic council, and junior fellow the Machine Intelligence & Signal Processing Group at the chair of human–machine communication. From 2009 to 2010, he worked as a computer scientist at the French CNRS-LIMSI in Orsay near Paris, as well as visiting scientist in the Department of Computing at Imperial College London, UK. In 2011, he was an ERASMUS lecturer at the University of Ancona, Italy, and a guest at NICTA in Sydney, Australia. In 2012, he was Visiting Key Researcher at the Institute for Information Technology and Communication Technology at Joanneum Research Forschungsgesellschaft mbH in Graz, Austria, for which he remained a consultant until 2017. At the end of 2012, he co-founded audEERING GmbH, based in Gilching near Munich and Berlin, Germany, where he has been managing director ever since and is the current chief scientific officer (CSO). The startup of the Technical University of Munich (TUM), Germany, deals with solutions for intelligent audio analysis and counts major global enterprises among its customers. In 2013, he was honored as a permanent visiting professor at the Chinese Harbin Institute of Technology, was a visiting professor at CISA at the University of Geneva and was subsequently appointed associate. He also represented the new chair of computer science with a focus on sensor technology at the University of Passau. He received calls to Great Britain in Edinburgh and London – and accepted a position as senior lecturer at Imperial College London, which promoted him in 2015 to reader in machine learning, and in 2018 to professor of artificial intelligence. He further accepted a call to the University of Passau as full professor of the newly established chair of complex and intelligent systems (initially chair of computer science with a focus on complex systems engineering) in 2014. In 2017, he accepted a professorship for embedded intelligence for healthcare and wellbeing both in the Faculty of Applied Computer Science and the Faculty of Medicine at the University of Augsburg.

Schuller was elected president of the Association for the Advancement of Affective Computing (AAAC) – the International Association for Affective Computing registered as a charity in the UK. He is the co-founder and was editor-in-chief of the IEEE Transactions on Affective Computing, and General Chair of IEEE ACII 2019 and ACM ICMI 2014. Schuller co-ordinated the European ASC Inclusion Project and was principal investigator in a variety of European (including ARIA-VALUSPA, De-ENIGMA, iHEARu, MixedEmotions, PROPEREMO, SEMAINE, SEWA) and national collaborative projects (including EmotAss).

== Work ==
His research interests include machine intelligence, signal processing with a focus on audio, affective computing and health informatics. Schuller is the initiator and annual main organizer of the science competitions INTERSPEECH Computational Paralinguistics Challenge since 2009 and Audio / Visual Emotion Challenge since 2011 in the field of computer perception and machine learning.

== Selected prizes ==
- 2015 and 2016: One of 40 extraordinary scientists of the World Economic Forum (WEF) under 40 years ("Young Scientist") as well as speaker at the "WEF Summer Davos" and speaker in the BetaZone
- In 2013, Schuller received a Starting Grant from the ERC amounting to 1.5 million euros, the highest endowed EU grant for young researchers.
- 2018: Fellow of the IEEE for contributions to computer audition

== Publications ==
Schuller is author and co-author of more than 800 papers in peer-reviewed books, journals, and conference proceedings, amassing more than 90,000 citations as of November 2026.

Theses:

- Man, machine, emotion – recognition from linguistic and manual interaction. VDM publishing house Dr Mueller, Saarbruecken 2007, ISBN 978-3-8364-1522-4.
- Intelligent Audio Analysis. Signals and Communication Technology, Springer, 2013, ISBN 978-3-642-36805-9.

Monographs / compilations:

- with Anton Batliner: Computational Paralinguistics: Emotion, Affect and Personality in Speech and Language Processing. Wiley, Chichester 2013, ISBN 978-1-119-97136-8.
- with Alexandra Balahur-Dobrescu and Maite Taboada: Computational Methods for Affect Detection from Natural Language. Computational Social Sciences, Springer, Heidelberg 2014, ISBN 978-3-319-00601-7.
- with Kristian Kroschel and Gerhard Rigoll: Statistical Information Technology. 5th edition. Springer Verlag, Berlin / Heidelberg 2011, ISBN 978-3-642-15953-4.

== Links ==
- Personal homepage of Björn Schuller
