= Associative classifier =

Machine learning model type

An associative classifier (AC) is a kind of supervised learning model that uses association rules to assign a target value. The term associative classification was coined by Bing Liu et al., in which the authors defined a model made of rules "whose right-hand side are restricted to the classification class attribute".

== Model ==
The model generated by an AC and used to label new records consists of association rules, where the consequent corresponds to the class label. As such, they can also be seen as a list of "if-then" clauses: if the record matches some criteria (expressed in the left side of the rule, also called antecedent), it is then labeled accordingly to the class on the right side of the rule (or consequent).

Most ACs read the list of rules in order, and apply the first matching rule to label the new record.

== Metrics ==
The rules of an AC inherit some of the metrics of association rules, like the support or the confidence. Metrics can be used to order or filter the rules in the model and to evaluate their quality.

== Implementations ==
The first proposal of a classification model made of association rules was FBM. The approach was popularized by CBA, although other authors had also previously proposed the mining of association rules for classification. Other authors have since then proposed multiple changes to the initial model, like the addition of a redundant rule pruning phase or the exploitation of Emerging Patterns.

Notable implementations include:

- CMAR
- CPAR
- L^{3}
- CAEP
- GARC
- ADT.
