= University of Passau =

University in Bavaria, Germany

Coordinates: 48°34′06″N 13°27′12″E

- Universität Passau
- Type: Public
- Established: 1622; 1 January 1973 – as University of Passau
- Budget: € 92.9 million (2026)
- President: Jan Hendrik Schumann
- Academic staff: 760 (2026)
- Administrative staff: 549 (2026)
- Students: 9,952 (2026)
- Location: Passau, Bavaria, Germany
- Campus: Urban
- Colours: Orange and grey
- Website: www.uni-passau.de

The University of Passau (German: Universität Passau) is a public research university located in Passau, Lower Bavaria, Germany. Founded in 1973, it is one of the youngest universities in Bavaria and consequently has the most modern campus in the state. Nevertheless, its roots as the Institute for Catholic Studies dates back to the early 17th century.

Today it is home to five faculties and 39 different undergraduate and postgraduate degree programmes.

== History ==
The university was established on 1 January 1973 by a resolution of the Bayerischer Landtag (Bavarian State Parliament). However its history goes back to 1622 when an Institute for Catholic Studies was incorporated into the Gymnasium founded by Fürst Leopold in 1612. In 1773, the school was renamed fürstbischöfliche Akademie, highlighting its relationship to the bishop. Nevertheless, in 1803 it was downgraded to a kurfürstliches Lyzeum, which meant a loss of status. After a period of abandonment, it was re-established as Passauer Lyzeum.

This lyceum grew over the years until it became a philosophical-theological university in 1923. Under the Nazi regime the university was forced to change its logo, but in 1950 a new seal was introduced, representing Mary with The Child Jesus vanquishing evil. The strong religious symbolism of this logo was considered inappropriate for the new university and replaced with a neutral logo. In 1969, the city council initiated negotiations to establish a university out of the old Faculty.

== Campus ==
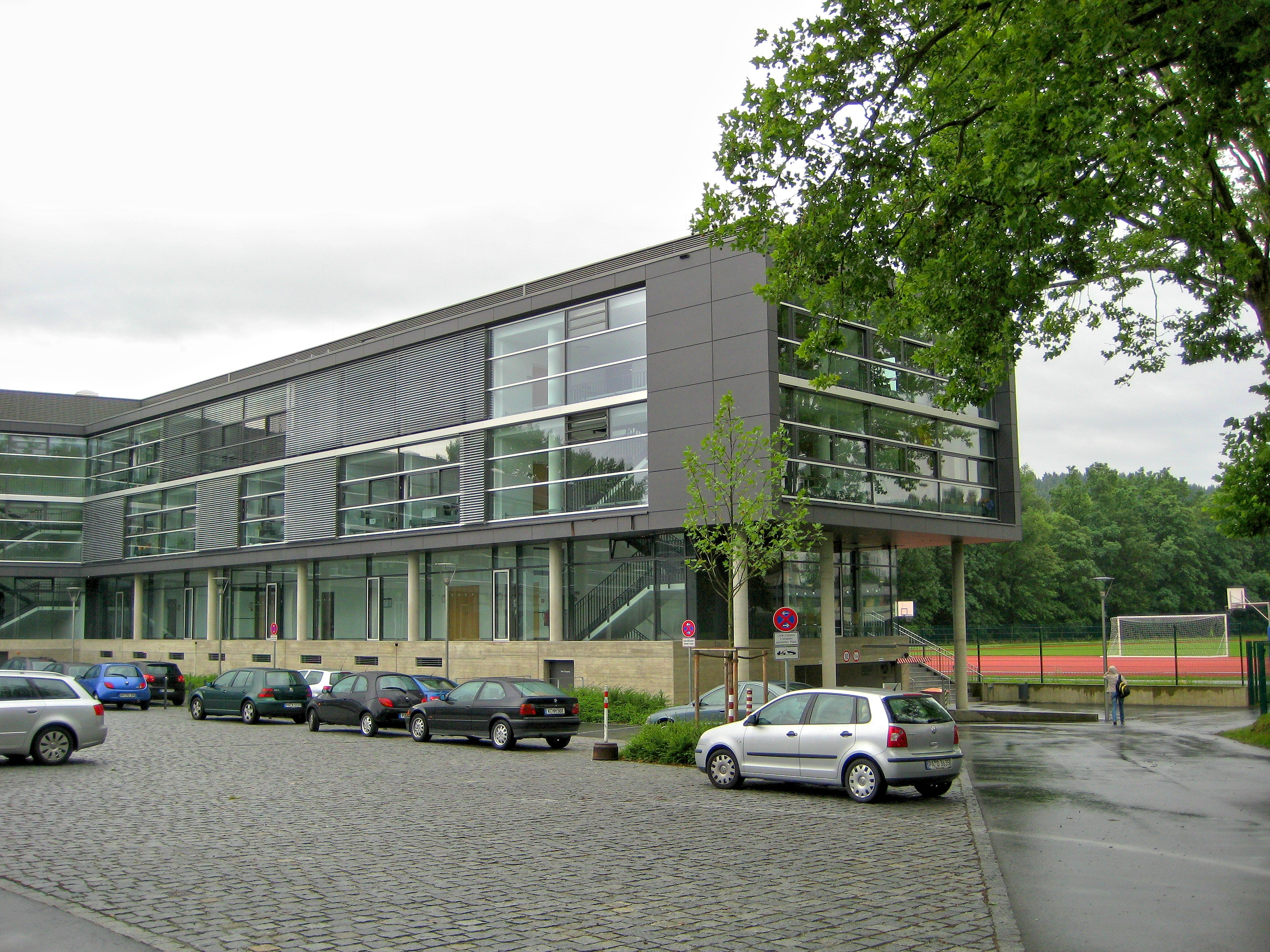
IT Centre and International House

The campus of the University of Passau is probably unique in Germany. With the exception of the Department of Catholic Theology, which is in the Old Town, and a number of offices in the city centre, all faculties are situated on a single campus along a single street. This is advantageous for the internal communication of students and staff, particularly because the university offers many interdisciplinary courses. Hence, it is not uncommon for law courses to be held in the Philosophicum (Arts and Humanities building) and vice versa. The campus is stretched out along the left bank of the Inn river, making it an idyllic place to study. The gardens and meadows are very popular with students in the summer.

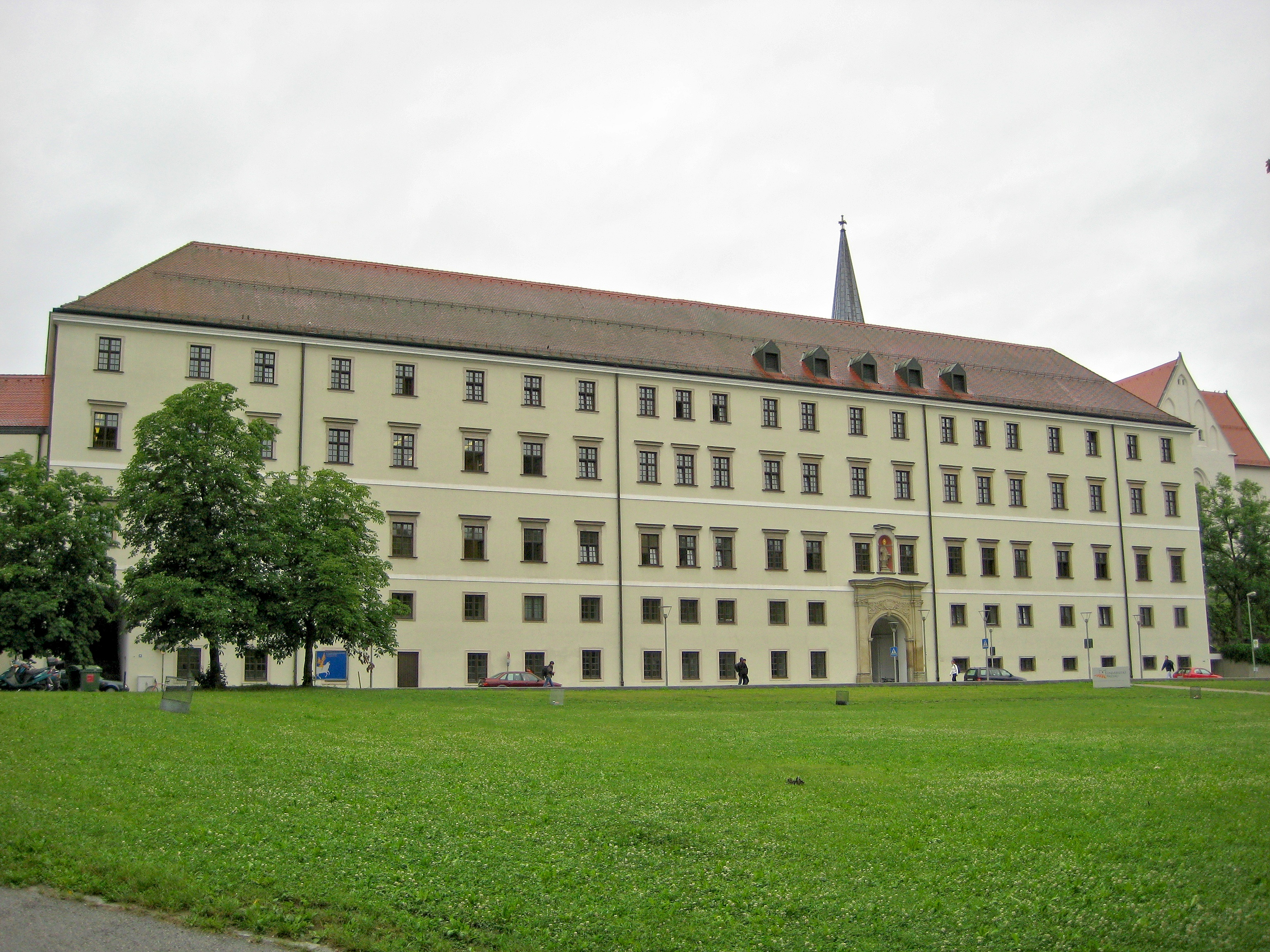
The Nikolakloster building

The Nikolakloster building is the oldest building on campus, existing long before the university was established. It is also the only building that breaks with the university's otherwise modern architecture. Today, this former convent is home to the language centre. On the opposite end of the campus are the IT Centre (ITZ) building and the sports grounds. The latest addition to the campus, inaugurated in 2014, is the Centre for Media and Communication, which houses a state-of-the-art newsroom.

The university's sports facilities include four gymnasiums, a football pitch and an athletics field with a race track.

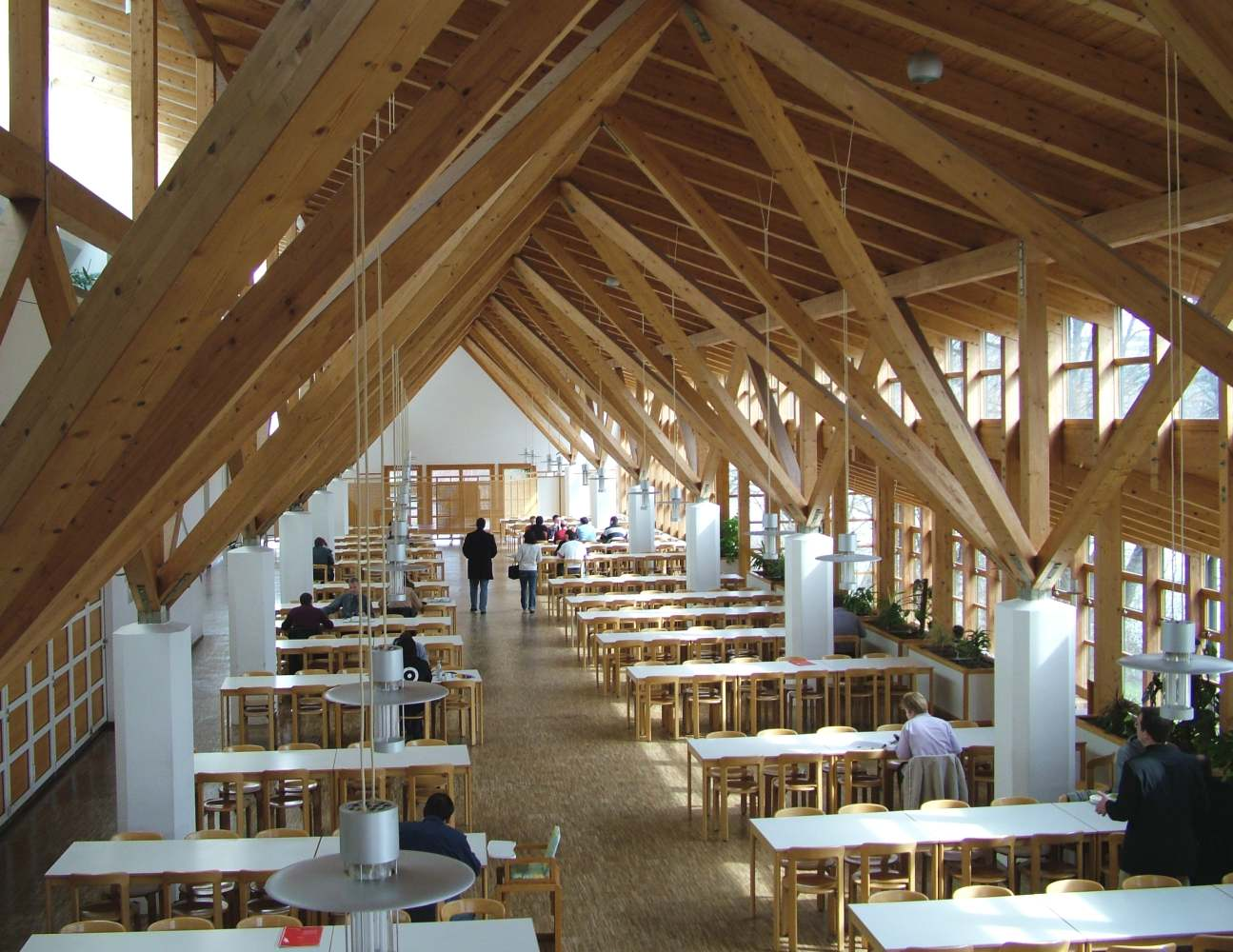
The refectory

A wide range of sports courses are offered throughout the semester and are free to staff and students, including football, volleyball, basketball, rowing, martial arts and aerobics.

The University of Passau has an award-winning refectory with a seating capacity of 560. The campus additionally has four cafeterias, which offer sandwiches, confectionery, coffee, soft drinks and – this being Bavaria – beer.

The university's crèche is open to children of students and staff. It is unusual for a German university to have day care facilities, but the reasonably-priced service is well used by students with toddlers aged 1 to 3.

=== Library ===
The library was established together with the university in 1978 and opened its doors to students and citizens of Passau the same year. The central library is the main library of the university and, together with the five faculty and institute libraries, constitutes the university's library system. Its Director is Dr Steffen Wawra. The university library currently has two million books and 3,050 journals. There are a total of 1,000 desk spaces for library users in the reading rooms, which are open 16 hours a day.

== Organisation ==
=== Governance ===
The University Executive consists of the President, Professor Jan Hendrik Schumann, four Vice Presidents – Professors Harald Kosch (Academic Infrastructure, IT and Sustainability), Bettina Noltenius (Studies and Teaching), Maximilian Sailer (Knowledge Transfer and Teacher Education) and Daniela Wawra (International Affairs and Diversity) – as well as Head of Administration Barbara Tasch and Deputy Head of Administration Sabine Wiendl.

The Senate is the legislative branch of the university. The president and vice presidents are senators ex officio, as are the deans of the faculties and the university's gender equality officer.

=== Faculties ===
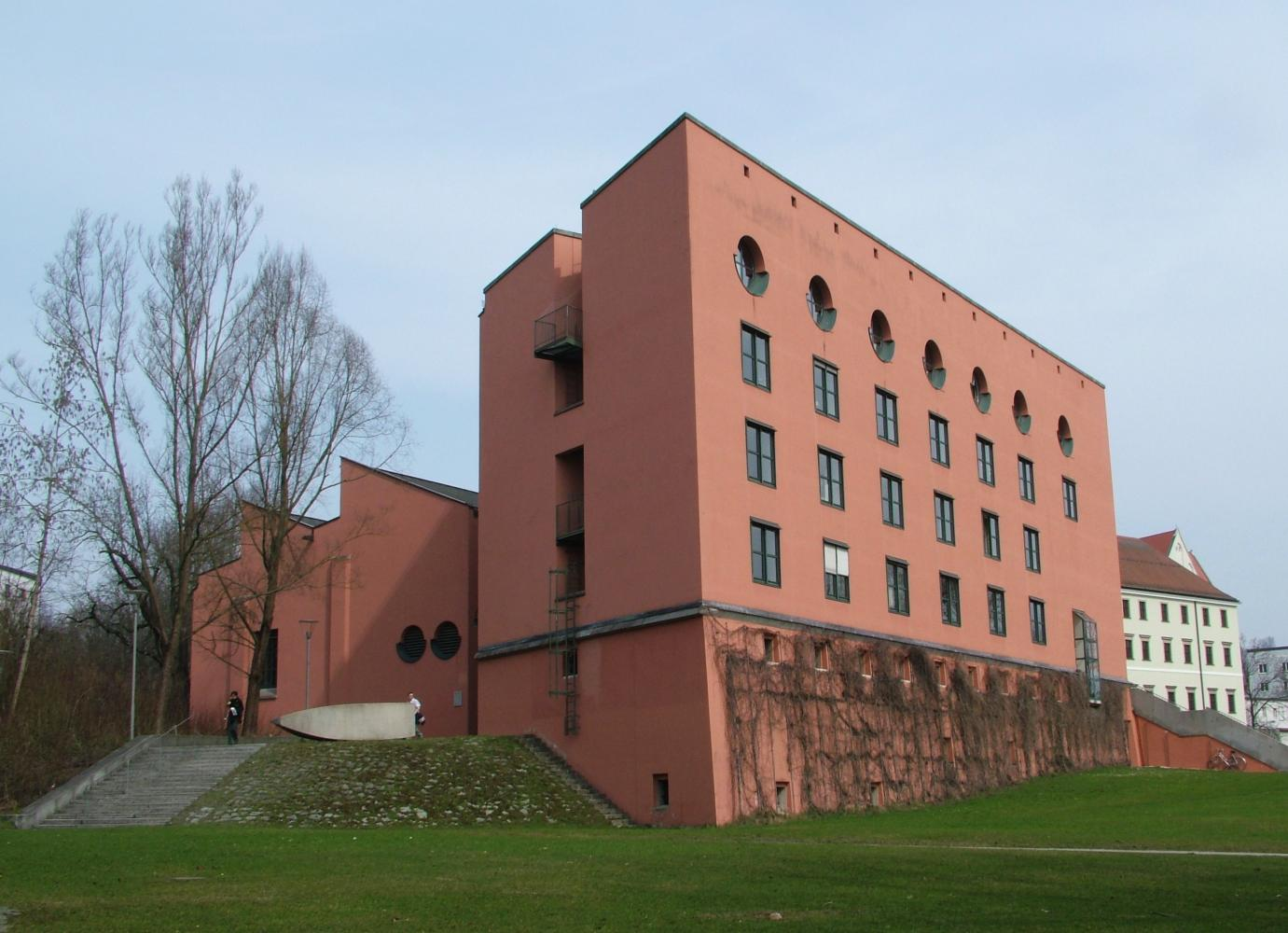
Philosophicum (Arts and Humanities building)

The University of Passau has five faculties: Law; Business, Economics and Information Systems; Social and Educational Sciences; Humanities and Cultural Studies; and Computer Science and Mathematics.

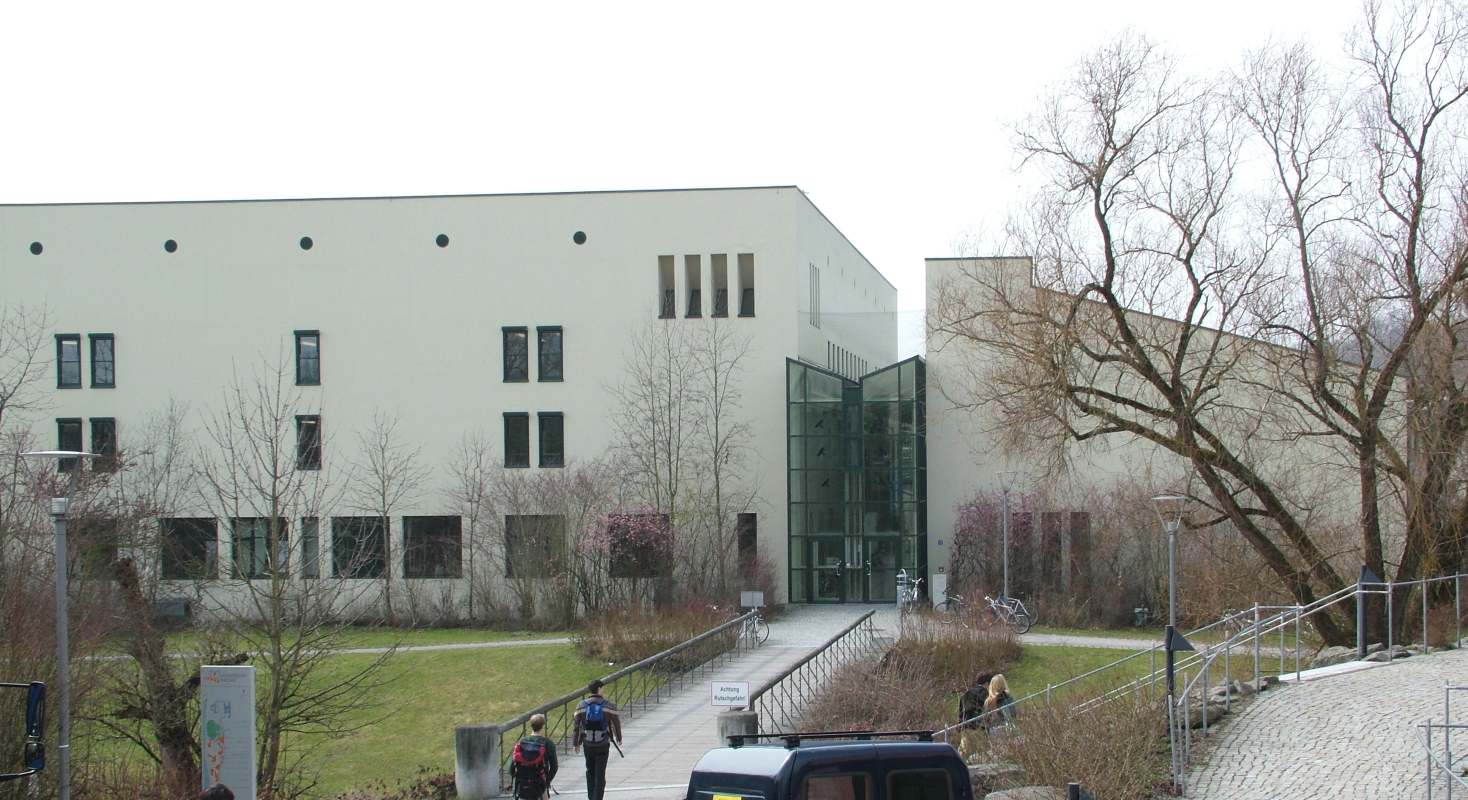
The Computer Science building

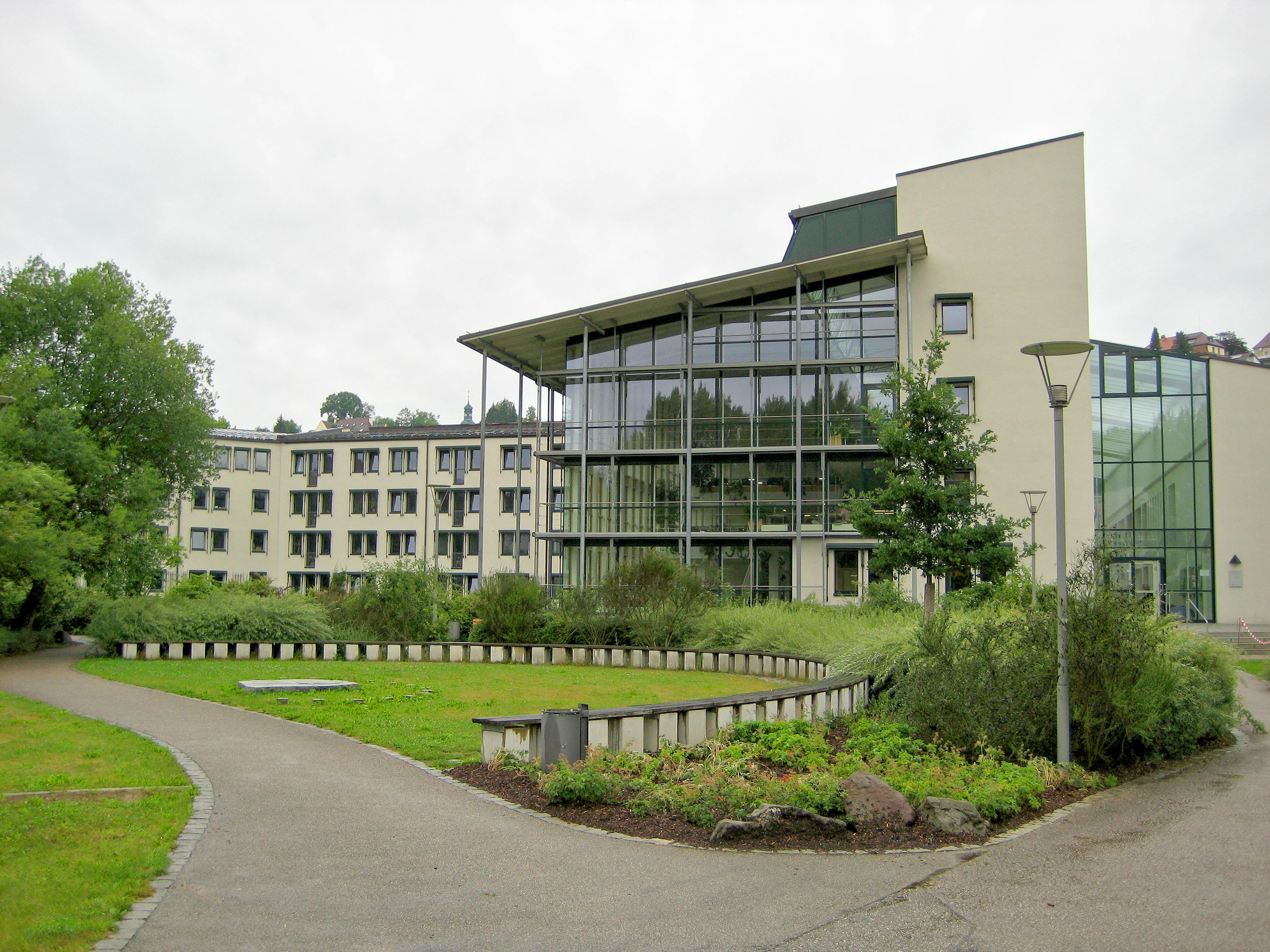
The Law Faculty building

In 2010 the Department of Catholic Theology and the Chair of Philosophy became inactive for a planned 15 years, a highly controversial decision, as the academic staff of the faculty had received numerous awards in recognition of their research achievements. The Department of Catholic Theology now offers catholic religious education as a specialisation for students enrolled in one of the teacher training programmes or the M.A. programme in Charity Studies.

=== Associated institutes ===
- Centre for European Law (CEP)
- Institute for the Didactics of Law
- Institute of International and Comparative Law
- Institut CENTOURIS - Center for data-based insights
- Institute of Private Financial Planning (IFP)
- Institute of Applied Ethics in Business, Professional Training and in Continuing Education (ethik WAW)
- Institute of Eastern Bavaria Area Studies (IKON)
- Institute of Intercultural Communication (ink.up)
- Institute of Interdisciplinary Media Science (IFIM)
- Institute of Information Systems and Software Engineering (IFIS)
- Institute of IT Security and Security Law (ISL)
- Institute of Software Systems in Technical Applications of Computer Science (FORWISS Passau)
- Passau Institute of Digital Security (PIDS)

=== Research centres ===
- Research Centre for Human Rights in Criminal Proceedings
- Research Centre for IT Law and Internet Policy
- Research Centre for Basic Research in Cultural Studies
- Research Centre for Early Modern German Literature
- Centre for Pedagogical Research
- Mathematics and Informatics Education Unit

== Partnerships ==
The University of Passau is well-known beyond the borders of Bavaria and Germany for its international orientation and atmosphere. The university maintains co-operative partnerships with some 236 foreign universities in the Americas, Europe, Asia and Australia, enabling students enrolled at the university to spend part of their studies abroad. The partner universities include King's College and the University of Stirling in the UK, the Autonomous University of Barcelona and Autonomous University of Madrid in Spain, Lund University in Sweden, Texas A&M University and Augustana College in the United States, the Universidad del Salvador in Argentina, the University of Santiago, Chile, the Université Laval in Canada, Kyoto Sangyo University in Japan, Zhejiang International Studies University and Beijing Foreign Studies University in China, Thammasat University and University Chiang Mai in Thailand, Universitas Indonesia in Indonesia as well as the National University of Vietnam, the Lahore University of Management Sciences in Pakistan, the Indian Institute of Technology Madras in India and Amirkabir University of Technology in Iran.

== Rankings ==
University rankings

Overall – Global & National
THE World 2024	401–500	37–41

In the Times Higher Education World University Rankings of 2024, the university is placed at 401–500th globally and 37–41st within the country.

== Student life ==
=== Student associations ===
The university supports a number of student groups in various fields of interest. Among them are eight political groups, two drama societies, three university orchestras, two choirs, several NGO’s groups such as Amnesty International, Unicef and AIESEC, several departments of specialised European student organisations such as Young European Federalists, AEGEE and ELSA, five societies dedicated to fostering international relations and cultural exchange, several subject-orientated groups, an association of cultural studies students, a debating society, a student-run management consulting group, and three religious student groups.

=== Sports ===
Despite the wide range of sports offered in the Sports Center of the university, there are only two teams that play at a competitive level. However, it should be kept in mind that unlike other countries, Germany does not have a long tradition of inter-university sporting competitions.

- American Football – Passau Red Wolves
- Lacrosse Passau

=== Fraternities ===
Fraternities have a long-standing tradition in Germany's student life, although the usage of the word carries very different connotations from that in the United States. German student fraternities are traditionally linked to nationalism, sometimes combined with old-fashioned social and religious views. Such societies are usually male and involve dressing up in traditional 19th Century outfits, as well as drinking and fighting with swords. Due to controversies around some fraternities' attitudes to race, history and German identity, fraternities are a contentious issue among students. There are five fraternities in Passau:

- Corps Budissa Leipzig (affiliated with the Kösener Senioren-Convents-Verband)
- K.St.V. Boiotro (affiliated with the Kartellverband katholischer deutscher Studentenvereine)
- Burschenschaft Hanseatia
- Akad. Burschenschaft Markomannia Wien (affiliated with the Deutsche Burschenschaft)
- K.D.St.V. Oeno-Danubia im CV (affiliated with the Cartellverband der katholischen deutschen Studentenverbindungen)

=== Traditions ===
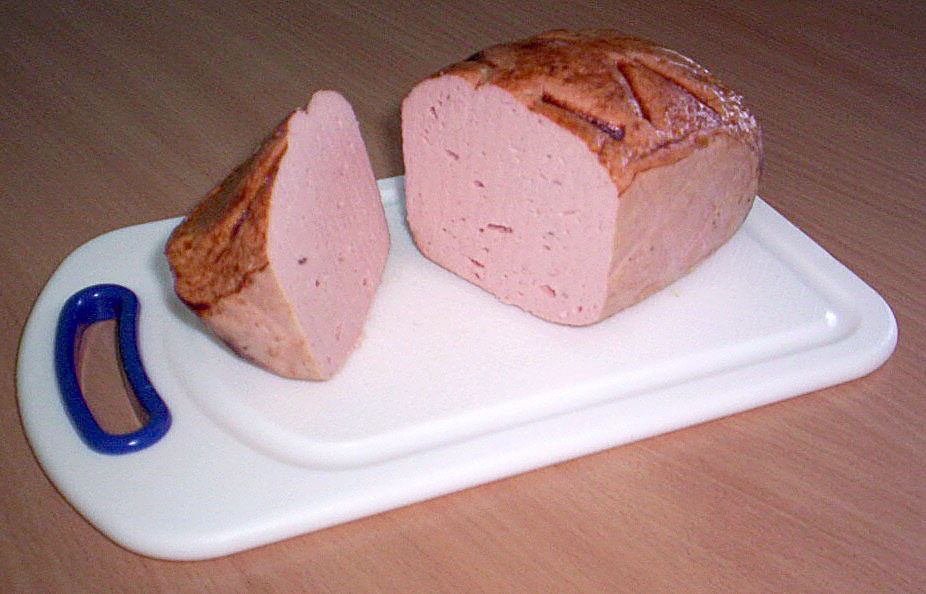
Leberkäse

A tradition for first-year students in Passau is a welcome reception in the refectory with typical Bavarian foods: Leberkäse, Bavarian Pretzels (which are different from the American ones) and beer. The welcome speeches are held by the president of the university and the mayor of Passau.

Another traditional part of Passau's student life are the Orientation Weeks, intended to acquaint new students with Passau and its university. During those weeks students are offered guided tours of the university, libraries, the city and of course the bars and clubs.
