= IEEE Security & Privacy =

- Language: English
- Edited by: Sean Peisert

Publication details
- History: 2003–present
- Publisher: IEEE Computer Society
- Frequency: Bimonthly
- Impact factor: 3.573 (2020)

Standard abbreviations
- ISO 4: IEEE Secur. Priv.

Indexing
- ISSN: 1540-7993

Links
- Journal homepage; IEEE Xplore Digital Library

IEEE Security & Privacy is a peer-reviewed scientific journal published by jointly by the IEEE Computer Society and the IEEE Reliability Society. It covers security, privacy, and dependability of computer-based systems. The publication includes studies, surveys, tutorials, columns, and in-depth interviews of interest to the information security industry.

The editor in chief is Sean Peisert; the preceding editor was David M. Nicol.

It is indexed in Scopus and in Science Citation Index Expanded; the 2020 impact factor is 3.573.
