= Expert Systems with Applications =

- Discipline: Computer science, Artificial intelligence
- Language: English
- Edited by: Ling Wang

Publication details
- History: 1990-present
- Publisher: Elsevier
- Impact factor: 9.4 (2025)

Standard abbreviations
- ISO 4: Expert Syst. Appl.

Indexing
- ISSN: 0957-4174 (print); 1873-6793 (web)
- OCLC no.: 38945741

Links
- Journal homepage; Online archive

Expert Systems with Applications is a peer-reviewed academic journal covering computer science and artificial intelligence. More specifically, it focuses on expert systems and intelligent systems. It is a British journal published in English. Established in 1990, the journal is published 36 times per year by Elsevier. Its editor-in-chief is Ling Wang of Tsinghua University.

According to the Journal Citation Reports, the journal had a 2025 impact factor of 9.4. Google Scholar Metrics ranks it fifth among journals in the field of artificial intelligence. With an h-index of 315, it also ranks second in the same field according to this metric.

Also as of 2026, according to Google Scholar, it has an h5-index of 183 and h5-median index of 268.
