= Bumblebee (Transformers) =

Transformers character

- Transformers character
- First appearance: The Transformers
- Voiced by: Dan Gilvezan, Yoku Shioya, Keegan-Michael Key, others

In-universe information
- Affiliation: Autobot

Bumblebee, also called Goldbug and B-127, is a fictional robot character appearing in the many installments of the Transformers franchise. The character is a member of the Autobots, a group of sentient transforming extraterrestrial robotic lifeforms. In the original line of toys and in the animated series, Bumblebee can transform into a small yellow Volkswagen Beetle. The live-action film versions of Bumblebee are instead depicted as transforming into a yellow Chevrolet Camaro.

== History ==
In 1984, Hasbro relicensed toys from the Japanese Diaclone and Microchange franchises by Takara for sale in the United States. The toys were rebranded into the Transformers series. The first Transformers toys released in the US were Autobot "Mini-Cars", including the Bumblebee toy, which could transform into a miniature yellow Volkswagen Beetle. Bumblebee's name was created by Bob Budiansky for the Transformers comic series by Marvel Comics.

Bumblebee appears in the first episode of the 1980s Transformers cartoon. He and fellow Autobot Wheeljack are the first two Transformers to appear on screen. He is able to transform into a yellow Volkswagen Beetle, and he serves as a scout and reconnaissance officer for the Autobots due to his small size. After he and the other Autobots chase the Decepticons to Earth, Bumblebee becomes best friends with the human Spike Witwicky. In the show's third season, Bumblebee receives an upgraded body and takes the name Goldbug. Within the original cartoon, Bumblebee is voiced by Dan Gilvezan in English and Yoku Shioya in Japanese. When the Transformers franchise rebooted with a new cast of characters for Transformers: Beast Wars, Bumblebee could not be included due to Hasbro having lost the rights to his name.

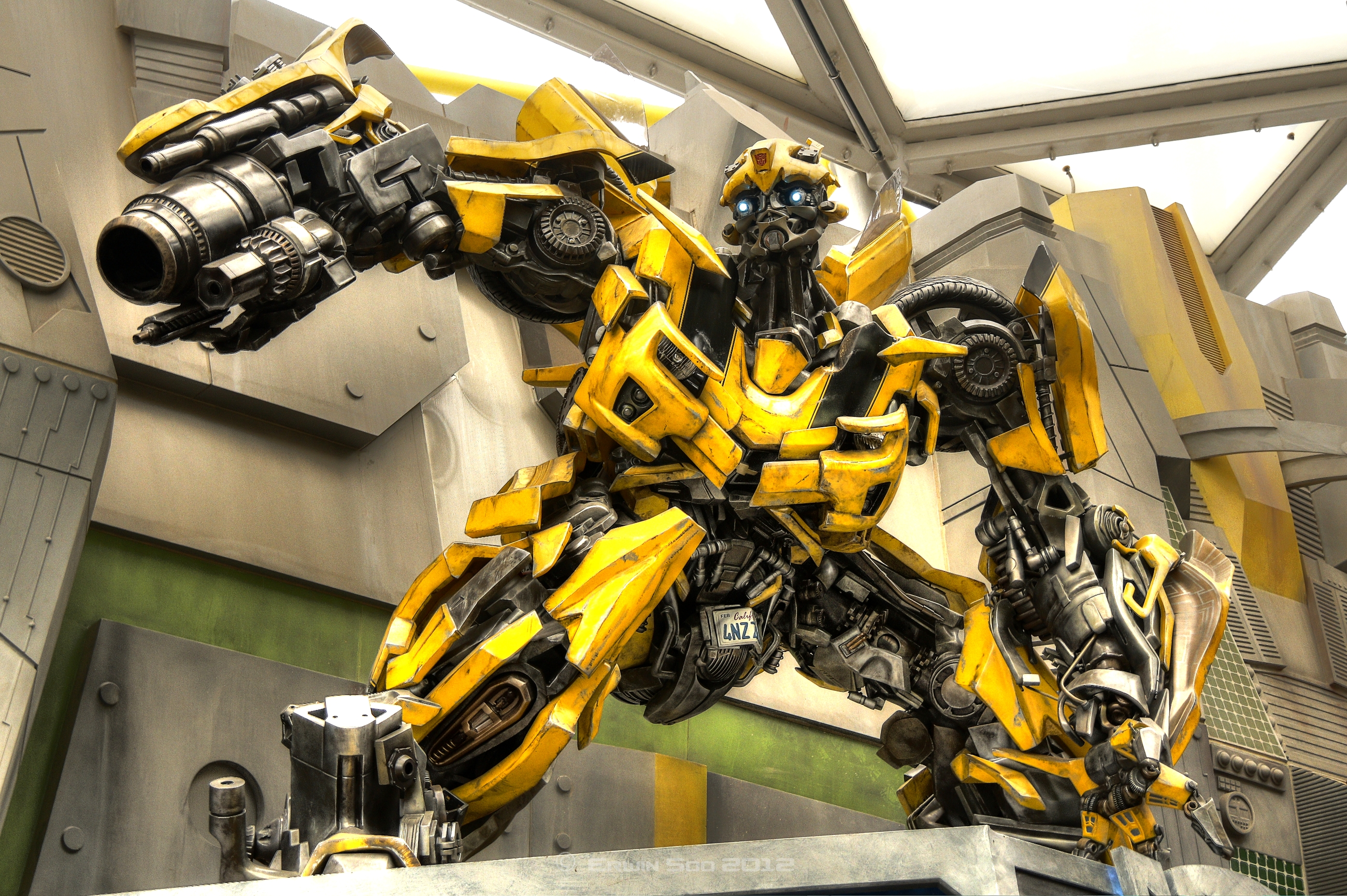
A statue of the live-action Bumblebee design at Transformers: The Ride – 3D in Universal Studios Singapore

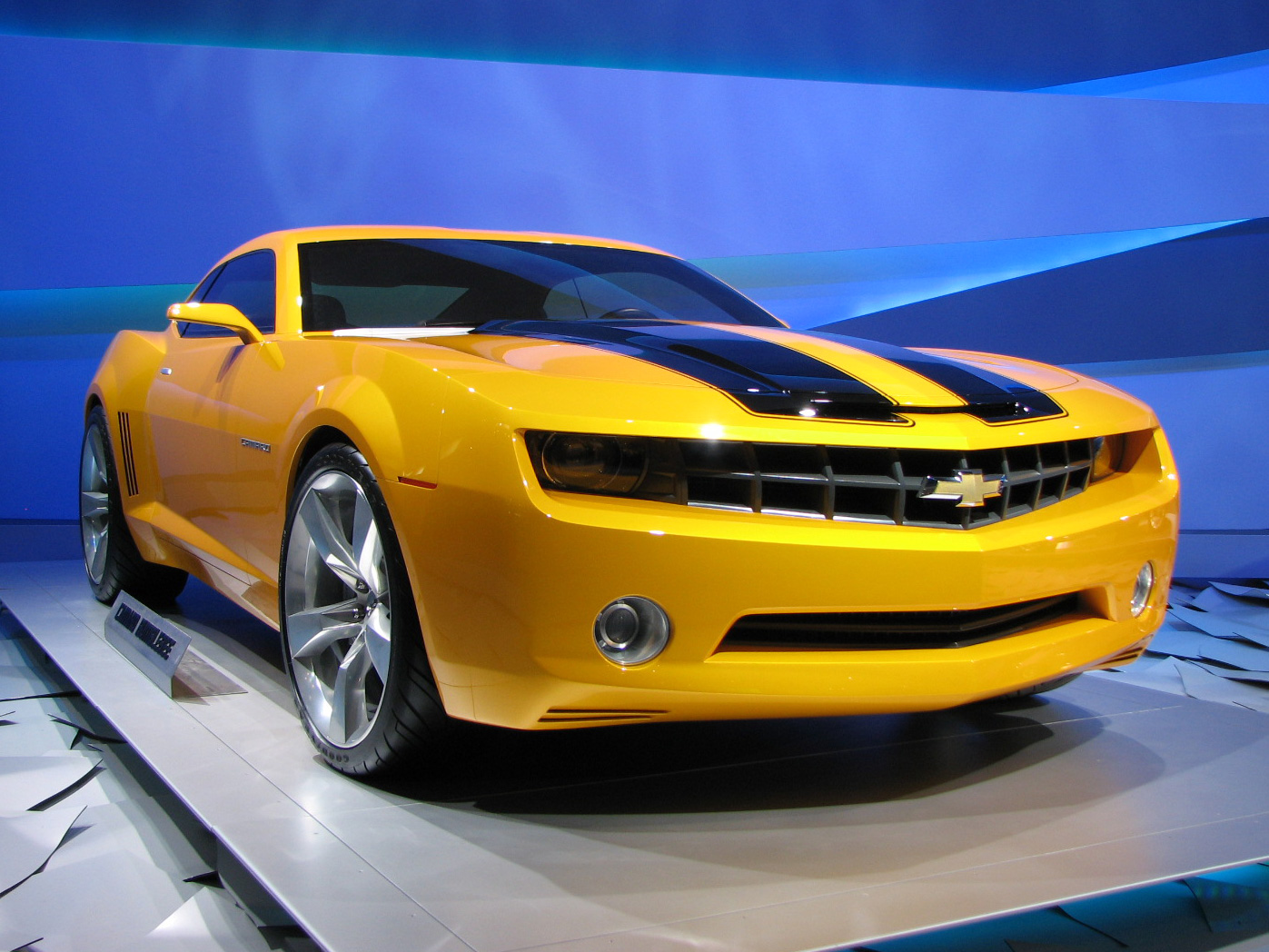
One of the Chevrolet Camaros used to depict Bumblebee in the live-action Transformers film series

Hasbro reacquired the rights to Bumblebee's name by the 2000s and included him as a main character in the 2007 live-action Transformers film. Bumblebee's design and characterization were changed significantly for the film. Volkswagen did not allow a Beetle to be used in the film, so Bumblebee's alternate mode was replaced with a Chevrolet Camaro sports car. Bumblebee in the film is also no longer depicted as the smallest Autobot, and instead of speaking he communicates using his car radio. Bumblebee's appearance in the 2007 film is what gained him mainstream popularity. He also had major roles in the sequel films, mainly as a companion to the human Sam Witwicky. Bumblebee transforms into multiple Camaro models in the live-action films, including a 1977 second generation model, a 2006 fifth generation model, and 2016 and 2018 sixth generation models. The 1977 Chevrolet Camaro that was used in the 2007 film was eventually sold for over $40,000 on eBay. Other Camaros used in the film were sold as a set for approximately $500,000, and proceeds were donated to the charity Operation Homefront. Bumblebee also appears briefly in Transformers: The Last Knight as a WWII-era military vehicle.

Bumblebee is the central character in the 2018 film Bumblebee, a reboot of the film series. The film establishes that Bumblebee arrived on Earth in 1987, thus retconning his WWII appearance in The Last Knight. In this film, Bumblebee more closely resembles his original cartoon depiction, and once again transforms into a Volkswagen Beetle; by the end of the film, he transforms into a 1977 Camaro as with the first film. Bumblebee returns in Transformers: Rise of the Beasts, which is part of the same rebooted universe as the Bumblebee film.

Bumblebee's appearances in series such as Transformers: Animated and Transformers: Prime take influence from his depictions in the live-action films. In Prime, Bumblebee cannot speak, much like his film version. Series such as Transformers: Cyberverse, Transformers: War for Cybertron Trilogy, and Transformers: EarthSpark, meanwhile take more inspiration from his 1980s cartoon appearance. For Transformers One, director Josh Cooley wanted Bumblebee to be talkative like he was in the original cartoon, which influenced the casting of Keegan-Michael Key in the role. Cooley directed Key to speak in his normal voice for the role of Bumblebee.

== See also ==
- Lists of Transformers characters
- Transformers (sculptures)
