= Bing Liu (computer scientist) =

Chinese-American computer scientist

Bing Liu is a Chinese-American professor of computer science who specializes in data mining, machine learning, and natural language processing. In 2002, he became a scholar at University of Illinois at Chicago. He holds a PhD from the University of Edinburgh (1988). His PhD advisors were Austin Tate and Kenneth Williamson Currie, and his PhD thesis was titled Reinforcement Planning for Resource Allocation and Constraint Satisfaction.

== Academic research ==
He developed a mathematical model that can reveal fake advertising. Also, he teaches the course "Data Mining" during the Fall and Spring semesters at UIC. The course usually involves a project and various quiz/examinations as grading criteria.

He is best known for his research on sentiment analysis (also called opinion mining), fake/deceptive opinion detection, and using association rules for prediction. He also made important contributions to learning from positive and unlabeled examples (or PU learning), Web data extraction, and interestingness in data mining.

Two of his research papers published in KDD-1998 and KDD-2004 received KDD Test-of-Time awards in 2014 and 2015. In 2013, he was elected chair of SIGKDD, ACM Special Interest Group on Knowledge Discovery and Data Mining.

=== Research on Association Rules For Prediction ===
Association rule-based classification takes into account the relationships between each item in a dataset and the class into which one is trying to classify that item. The basis is that there are two classes, a positive class and a negative class, into which one classifies items. Some classification algorithms only check if a case/item is in the positive class, without understanding how much exactly the probability of it being in that class is. Liu and his collaborators described a new association rule-based classification algorithm that takes into account the relationship between items and the positive and negative classes. Each item is given a probability or scoring of being in the positive class or the negative class. It then ranks the items as per which ones would be most likely to be in the positive class.

=== Research on Sentiment Analysis ===
In a paper that Liu collaborated on, "Opinion Word Expansion and Target Extraction through Double Propagation", Qiu, Liu, Bu and Chen studied the relationship between opinion lexicons and opinion targets. Opinion lexicons are word sets and opinion targets are topics on which there is an opinion. The authors of that paper discuss how their algorithm uses a limited opinion word set with the topic and through double propagation, one is able to form a more detailed opinion word set on a set of sentences. Double propagation is the back and forth functional process between the word set and topic as the word set updates itself. Some algorithms require set rules and thus are limited in what they can actually do and in what service they provide through updated opinion lists. Their algorithm only requires an initial word set, which is updated through finding relations between the words in the set and the target word or vice versa. The algorithm is done on a word population such as a set of sentences or a paragraph.

== Honors and awards ==
- In 2014, he was named Fellow of IEEE (Institute of Electrical and Electronics Engineers).
- In 2015, he was named Fellow of ACM "For contributions to knowledge discovery and data mining, opinion mining, and sentiment analysis".
- In 2016, he was elected Fellow of AAAI "For significant contributions to data mining and development of widely used sentiment analysis, opinion spam detection, and Web mining algorithms."

== Publications ==
=== Peer-reviewed Article List ===
- Liu, Bing, Yiming Ma, Ching Kian Wong, and Philip S. Yu. 2003. “Scoring the Data Using Association Rules.” Applied Intelligence 18(2):119–35.
- Qiu, Guang, Bing Liu, Jiajun Bu, and Chun Chen. 2011. “Opinion Word Expansion and Target Extraction through Double Propagation.” Computational Linguistics 37(1):9–27.
- Wu, Xindong et al. 2007. “Top 10 Algorithms in Data Mining.” Knowledge and Information Systems 14(1):1–37.
- Liu, Bing. 1995. “A Unified Framework for Consistency Check.” International Journal of Intelligent Systems 10(8):691–713.
- Zhang, Lei, Shuai Wang, and Bing Liu. 2018. “Deep Learning for Sentiment Analysis: A Survey.” Wiley Interdisciplinary Reviews: Data Mining and Knowledge Discovery 8(4).
- Wang, Guan, Sihong Xie, Bing Liu, and Philip S. Yu. 2012. “Identify Online Store Review Spammers via Social Review Graph.” ACM Transactions on Intelligent Systems and Technology 3(4):1–21.
- Yu, Zeng et al. 2019. “Reconstruction of Hidden Representation for Robust Feature Extraction.” ACM Transactions on Intelligent Systems and Technology 10(2):1–24.
- Wang, Jing, Clement T. Yu, Philip S. Yu, Bing Liu, and Weiyi Meng. 2015. “Diversionary Comments under Blog Posts.” ACM Transactions on the Web 9(4):1–34.
- Bing Liu, Wynne Hsu, Lai-Fun Mun, and Hing-Yan Lee. 1999. “Finding Interesting Patterns Using User Expectations.” IEEE Transactions on Knowledge and Data Engineering 11(6):817–32.
- Yanhong Zhai and Bing Liu. 2006. “Structured Data Extraction from the Web Based on Partial Tree Alignment.” IEEE Transactions on Knowledge and Data Engineering 18(12):1614–28.
- Yu, Huilin, Tieyun Qian, Yile Liang, and Bing Liu. 2020. “AGTR: Adversarial Generation of Target Review for Rating Prediction.” Data Science and Engineering 5(4):346–59.
- Bing Liu. 1997. “Route Finding by Using Knowledge about the Road Network.” IEEE Transactions on Systems, Man, and Cybernetics - Part A: Systems and Humans 27(4):436–48.
- Liu, Bing. 1993. “Problem Acquisition in Scheduling Domains.” Expert Systems with Applications 6(3):257–65.
- Liu, Bing. 1993. “Knowledge-Based Factory Scheduling: Resource Allocation and Constraint Satisfaction.” Expert Systems with Applications 6(3):349–59.
- Bing Liu, R. Grossman, and Yanhong Zhai. 2004. “Mining Web Pages for Data Records.” IEEE Intelligent Systems 19(06):49–55.
- Bing Liu, Wynne Hsu, Shu Chen, and Yiming Ma. 2000. “Analyzing the Subjective Interestingness of Association Rules.” IEEE Intelligent Systems 15(5):47–55.
- Liu, Bing and Alexander Tuzhilin. 2008. “Managing Large Collections of Data Mining Models.” Communications of the ACM 51(2):85–89.
- Liu, Qian, Zhiqiang Gao, Bing Liu, and Yuanlin Zhang. 2016. “Automated Rule Selection for Opinion Target Extraction.” Knowledge-Based Systems 104:74–88.
- Liu, Bing. 2017. “Lifelong Machine Learning: a Paradigm for Continuous Learning.” Frontiers of Computer Science 11(3):359–61.
- Poria, Soujanya, Ong Yew Soon, Bing Liu, and Lidong Bing. 2020. “Affect Recognition for Multimodal Natural Language Processing.” Cognitive Computation 13(2):229–30.
- Qian, Yuhua, Hang Xu, Jiye Liang, Bing Liu, and Jieting Wang. 2015. “Fusing Monotonic Decision Trees.” IEEE Transactions on Knowledge and Data Engineering 27(10):2717–28.
- Wang, Hao, Yan Yang, Bing Liu, and Hamido Fujita. 2019. “A Study of Graph-Based System for Multi-View Clustering.” Knowledge-Based Systems 163:1009–19.
- Li, Huayi, Bing Liu, Arjun Mukherjee, and Jidong Shao. 2014. “Spotting Fake Reviews Using Positive-Unlabeled Learning.” Computación y Sistemas 18(3).
- Zhai, Zhongwu, Bing Liu, Jingyuan Wang, Hua Xu, and Peifa Jia. 2012. “Product Feature Grouping for Opinion Mining.” IEEE Intelligent Systems 27(4):37–44.
- Apte, Chidanand, Bing Liu, Edwin P. Pednault, and Padhraic Smyth. 2002. “Business Applications of Data Mining.” Communications of the ACM 45(8):49–53.
- Li, Yanni et al. 2020. “ESA-Stream: Efficient Self-Adaptive Online Data Stream Clustering.” IEEE Transactions on Knowledge and Data Engineering 1–1.
- Robert Grossman, Pavan Kasturi, Donald Hamelberg, and Bing Liu. 2004. "An Empirical Study of the Universal Chemical Key Algorithm for Assigning Unique Keys to Chemical Compounds." Journal of Bioinformatics and Computational Biology 02(01):155–71.
- Liu, Bing et al. 1994. “Finding the Shortest Route Using Cases, Knowledge, and Djikstra's Algorithm.” IEEE Expert 9(5):7–11.
- Liu, Bing. 1994. "Specific Constraint Handling in Constraint Satisfaction Problems.” International Journal on Artificial Intelligence Tools 03(01):79–96.
