= Alexander Gelbukh =

- Александр Феликсович Гельбух
- Born: Alexander Felixovich Gelbukh; 1962 (age 63–64); Soviet Union
- Citizenship: Mexico, Russia
- Occupations: Computer scientist, computational linguist, professor
- Employer: Instituto Politécnico Nacional (Centro de Investigación en Computación)
- Known for: CICLing conference series Sentic computing & affective reasoning Conversational emotion recognition Syntactic n-grams & lexical morphology
- Title: Research Professor and Head of the Natural Language Processing Laboratory
- Spouse: Dr. Irina Gelbukh
- Awards: SNI / SNII Level 3 (Excellence); Member of the Mexican Academy of Sciences (2000); Google Latin America Research Award (2020); Fellow of the Mexican Society of Artificial Intelligence (2017); IPN Research Diploma (2009)

Academic background
- Education: Moscow State University (BSc, MSc); VINITI, Russian Academy of Sciences (PhD)

Academic work
- Institutions: Instituto Politécnico Nacional; Waseda University; University of Wolverhampton; Chung-Ang University; Higher School of Economics; Amity University
- Notable works: Computational Linguistics: Models, Resources, Applications (2004)
- Website: www.gelbukh.com

Alexander Felixovich Gelbukh (Russian: Александр Феликсович Гельбух; born 1962) is a Russian-Mexican computer scientist, computational linguist, and educator. He is a Research Professor and the Head of the Natural Language and Text Processing Laboratory at the Centro de Investigación en Computación (CIC) of the Instituto Politécnico Nacional (IPN) in Mexico City.

Gelbukh is an elected member of the Mexican Academy of Sciences (Academia Mexicana de Ciencias), an appointed National Researcher of Mexico (SNII Level 3, the highest regular tier), and a Fellow and past President of the Mexican Society of Artificial Intelligence (SMIA). In 2000, he founded the International Conference on Computational Linguistics and Intelligent Text Processing (CICLing), which he chaired as it traveled across North America, Europe, and Asia. His research covers sentiment analysis, emotion recognition in conversations, opinion mining, computational morphology, text summarization, and biomedical text mining. In 2020, he was a recipient of the Google Latin America Research Award (LARA).

== Early life and education ==
Gelbukh was born in 1962 in the Soviet Union. He pursued higher education in mathematics and computer science at Moscow State University (MGU), graduating with an honors Master of Science degree from the Faculty of Mechanics and Mathematics in 1990 with a specialization in computational linguistics.

He continued his postgraduate studies at the All-Russian Institute for Scientific and Technical Information (VINITI) under the Russian Academy of Sciences. In 1995, he earned his Doctor of Philosophy (PhD) in Computer Science (Candidate of Technical Sciences, specialty in Informatics). His doctoral dissertation, titled An Effectively Implementable Model of Inflectional Natural Language Morphology (Russian: Эффективно реализуемая модель морфологии флективного языка), introduced high-efficiency algorithmic dictionary indexing and storage methods for morphologically complex inflectional languages.

== Academic career ==
Between 1988 and 1992, Gelbukh worked as a research fellow at the All-Union Center for Scientific and Technical Information (AUSTIC / VNTICenter) of the USSR State Committee for Science and Technology and Academy of Sciences. From 1994 to 1996, he served as a consultant for MediaLingva Inc. in Moscow, creating morphological engines and digital lexicons, and lectured on computational linguistics in the Department of Linguistics at Moscow State University.

In 1997, Gelbukh relocated to Mexico to join the newly established Centro de Investigación en Computación (CIC) at the Instituto Politécnico Nacional (IPN) in Mexico City. He established and became head of the Laboratory of Natural Language and Text Processing (Laboratorio de Procesamiento de Lenguaje Natural). Over nearly three decades, Gelbukh mentored and graduated more than 70 doctoral and master's students from more than 18 countries, including Bangladesh, Colombia, Cuba, India, Iran, Mexico, Nigeria, Pakistan, Russia, Ukraine, and Vietnam. Students supervised under his mentorship have received institutional and national honors, including the IPN Best Thesis Prize (awarded to Hiram Calvo in 2006 and Navonil Majumder in 2020) and multiple first-place finishes in the National AI Thesis Competition of the Mexican Society of Artificial Intelligence.

Gelbukh has held several visiting and honorary international appointments:

- Distinguished Visiting Professor at Chung-Ang University in Seoul, South Korea (2003–2004).
- Invited Professor of the doctoral systems engineering program at the National University of Colombia in Bogotá (since 2008).
- Visiting Scholar and Invited Researcher at Waseda University in Tokyo, Japan (2010–2011 and 2011–2014).
- Visiting Professor at the Sholokhov Moscow State University for the Humanities (2013–2016).
- Senior Researcher at the International Laboratory for Intelligent Systems and Structural Analysis at the Higher School of Economics in Moscow (2016–2017).
- Honorary Professor at Amity University in Noida, India (appointed 2017).
- Visiting Researcher at the Research Group in Computational Linguistics at the University of Wolverhampton, United Kingdom (2018–2019).

== Research contributions ==
Gelbukh has authored, co-authored, or edited more than 500 scientific papers, book chapters, and monographs in artificial intelligence and natural language processing.

=== Affective computing and sentic computing ===
Gelbukh is known for his work in sentiment analysis, emotion mining, and affective commonsense reasoning. Collaborating with Erik Cambria and Soujanya Poria, he contributed to the development of sentic computing frameworks and affective semantic spaces such as EmoSenticSpace and SenticNet extensions, integrating linguistic rules with vector representations of emotion concepts. In conversational artificial intelligence, he co-authored seminal architectures for emotion detection across sequential dialogues, including DialogueRNN (an attentive recurrent network) and DialogueGCN (a graph convolutional neural network modeling speaker relations).

=== Linguistic models and syntactic n-grams ===
Gelbukh's early work focused on formal models of grammar, Meaning-Text Theory, and dictionary structures. In 2004, he co-authored the comprehensive volume Computational Linguistics: Models, Resources, Applications with Igor A. Bolshakov. Together with Grigori Sidorov, he investigated syntactic n-grams—sequences of words traversed along syntactic dependency trees rather than linear surface order—demonstrating improvements in authorship attribution, sentiment classification, and stylistic text processing.

=== Social media analysis, misinformation, and clinical NLP ===
In later years, Gelbukh focused on applying transformer language models and deep neural networks to online content analysis, including automated detection of fake news, hate speech, cyberbullying, sarcasm, and hope speech across multilingual datasets (Spanish, English, Urdu, and Arabic). His team has also explored clinical natural language processing, using electronic health records and social text to identify early indicators of depression, mental illness, and COVID-19 medical risks.

== Scientific community service ==
=== Conference organization ===
In 2000, Gelbukh established the International Conference on Computational Linguistics and Intelligent Text Processing (CICLing), serving as General and Program Chair. Over twenty annual editions, CICLing rotated through host countries including Mexico, South Korea, Israel, Romania, Japan, India, Greece, Nepal, Egypt, Turkey, Hungary, Vietnam, and France, with proceedings published in Springer's Lecture Notes in Computer Science (LNCS) series.

He also served as Program Co-Chair for multiple editions of the Mexican International Conference on Artificial Intelligence (MICAI) and led program tracks for conferences sponsored by IEEE, IBERAMIA, and the Mexican Computer Science Society (SMCC).

=== Professional societies and editorial work ===
Gelbukh served as President of the Mexican Society of Artificial Intelligence (SMIA) and earlier presided over the Mexican Association for Natural Language Processing (AMPLN). In 2017, SMIA awarded him the grade of Fellow in recognition of his foundational impact on artificial intelligence research in Mexico.

He is the Editor-in-Chief of Polibits (a peer-reviewed journal in computer science and engineering indexed in SciELO and Latindex) and the International Journal of Computational Linguistics and Applications (IJCLA). He has served on the editorial boards of academic journals including Cognitive Computation (Springer), Natural Language Engineering (Cambridge University Press), Journal of Intelligent & Fuzzy Systems (IOS Press), and Computación y Sistemas (IPN). He has edited more than 90 proceedings volumes and thematic issues.

== Media appearances and public outreach ==
Gelbukh and the research conducted at his Natural Language Processing Laboratory have been featured across Mexican national television, public broadcasting networks, and international science media:

- In 2021, the work of the CIC-IPN Natural Language Processing Laboratory was showcased on Mexican national television in the series Generación Impulso, broadcast nationwide on Canal Catorce (Channel 14) by the Sistema Público de Radiodifusión del Estado Mexicano (SPR), spotlighting breakthroughs in natural language processing, deep learning, and predictive models of social media influence.
- In July 2018, Gelbukh and his laboratory researchers were featured on the national television series Escaparate de Ideas (Episode 12), broadcast on Mexico's public educational network Canal Once (IPN), presenting their research on "Análisis de sentimientos y opinión en internet y redes sociales" (Sentiment and Opinion Analysis on the Internet and Social Networks).
- In November 2018, he appeared in Bogotá, Colombia, on Caro y Cuervo TV for an extended broadcast titled "La Lingüística Computacional de hoy" (Computational Linguistics Today), addressing the convergence of lexicography, linguistic corpora analysis, and automated language engineering.
- In December 2016, the National Council of Science and Technology (CONACYT) published a commemorative feature celebrating his 20th anniversary advancing computational linguistics in Mexico.
- In September 2017, he was interviewed by big data analytics publication Datanami on deep learning-based document modeling for personality detection from text.
- In 2026, the Noticiero Científico y Cultural Iberoamericano (NCC) and IPN's Conversus journal published an in-depth profile, "Alexander Gelbukh, el cartógrafo del lenguaje artificial" (The Cartographer of Artificial Language), recognizing his pioneering career spanning classical morphological models to deep generative architectures, his laboratory leadership at CIC-IPN, and his global ranking among leading computer scientists.

== Awards and honors ==
- Google Latin America Research Award (LARA) (2020) – Awarded by Google alongside doctoral advisee Segun Taofeek Aroyehun for conversational language research.
- Fellow of the Mexican Society of Artificial Intelligence (SMIA) (2017) – Conferred for distinguished lifetime service to Mexican AI.
- Distinguished Fellow, International Engineering and Technology Institute (IETI) (2015).
- Diploma a la Investigación (IPN Research Diploma) (2009) – Awarded by the Instituto Politécnico Nacional to one faculty researcher annually.
- Distinguished Visitor of the City of Apizaco (2006) – Bestowed by the City Council of Apizaco, Tlaxcala.
- Member of the Mexican Academy of Sciences (elected 2000) – Engineering and Technology Section.
- National Researcher of Mexico (SNII Level 3) – Maintained continuous membership in the Sistema Nacional de Investigadores since 1998, holding the highest regular rank (Level 3).
- Best Paper Awards:
  - Best Paper Award, 11th International Conference on Intelligent Computing (ICIC 2015, Fuzhou, China).
  - Best Performing Approach in Semantic Parsing, SemWebEval Challenge at the Extended Semantic Web Conference (ESWC 2014, Anissaras, Crete).
  - Best Paper Award (First Place), Mexican International Conference on Artificial Intelligence (MICAI 2011).
  - Best Paper Award (First Place), Mexican International Conference on Artificial Intelligence (MICAI 2010).
  - Best Paper Award, Mexican International Conference on Artificial Intelligence (MICAI 2000).

== Selected publications ==
=== Books ===
- Bolshakov, Igor A.; Gelbukh, Alexander (2004). Computational Linguistics: Models, Resources, Applications. Instituto Politécnico Nacional, UNAM, Fondo de Cultura Económica. p. 186. ISBN 970-36-0147-2.
- Gelbukh, Alexander; Sidorov, Grigori (2007). Procesamiento asociativo de textos en lenguaje natural (in Spanish). Instituto Politécnico Nacional. ISBN 978-970-36-0428-9.

=== Selected journal articles ===
- Majumder, Navonil; Poria, Soujanya; Hazarika, Devamanyu; Mihalcea, Rada; Gelbukh, Alexander; Cambria, Erik (2019). "DialogueRNN: An Attentive RNN for Emotion Detection in Conversation". Proceedings of the AAAI Conference on Artificial Intelligence. 33 (1): 6818–6825. doi:10.1609/aaai.v33i01.33016818.
- Poria, Soujanya; Cambria, Erik; Devillers, Laurence; Gelbukh, Alexander (2017). "Benchmarking multimodal sentiment analysis". Information Fusion. 37: 105–125. doi:10.1016/j.inffus.2017.02.003.
- Poria, Soujanya; Gelbukh, Alexander; Cambria, Erik; Hussain, Amir; Huang, Guang-Bin (2014). "EmoSenticSpace: A novel framework for affective common-sense reasoning". Knowledge-Based Systems. 69: 108–123. doi:10.1016/j.knosys.2014.06.011.
- Sidorov, Grigori; Velasquez, Francisco; Stamatatos, Efstathios; Gelbukh, Alexander; Chanona-Hernández, Liliana (2014). "Syntactic N-grams as machine learning features for natural language processing". Expert Systems with Applications. 41 (3): 853–860. doi:10.1016/j.eswa.2013.08.015.
- Poria, Soujanya; Gelbukh, Alexander; Hussain, Amir; Howard, Newton; Das, Dipankar; Bandyopadhyay, Sivaji (2013). "Enhanced SenticNet with Affective Labels for Concept-based Opinion Mining". IEEE Intelligent Systems. 28 (2): 31–38. doi:10.1109/MIS.2013.4.
