= Janice Jenkins =

American electrical and biomedical engineer

Janice M. Jenkins (1932–2023) was an American electrical engineer and biomedical engineer. She was the first woman to become a faculty member in the University of Michigan Department of Electrical Engineering and Computer Science working at the school for 22 years first serving as an assistant professor before being promoted to a full professor in 1992. During her time at the University of Michigan she also became the director of the medical computing research laboratory and the digital design laboratory.

Her research concerned electrocardiology and the automated analysis of heart rhythms, which she employed computing techniques and advanced signal processing to make significant contributions to these fields.

== Life ==
Jenkins was originally from Flint, Michigan, and grew up in a family of three sisters in Alton, Illinois. She married in 1951 and raised a family of five children.She entered college at the same time as her oldest child, at age 37. She studied at the University of Illinois Chicago, earning a bachelor's degree in 1974, a master's degree in 1976, and a Ph.D. in 1978. Just before receiving her final degree, her husband died.

She died on December 29, 2023.

== Work ==
After becoming an assistant professor of electrical engineering, computer science, and medicine at Northwestern University, she moved to the University of Michigan in 1980. . She directed the medical computing research laboratory from 1981 to 2002 and the digital design laboratory from 1983 to 1998. She became the advisor of 20 doctoral students, among them biometric expert Stephanie Schuckers.

As the director of the medical computing research laboratory (1981-2002) her research focused on automated arrhythmia analysis using advanced signal processing and computer techniques. She also had important collaboration with cardiac implant companies such as Medtronics and Boston Science who funded her work in defibrillator device and cardiac pacemakers control algorithms.

Jenkins research led her to working with the biomedical engineering graduate program and later the biomedical engineering department established in 1996 where she held a courtesy appointment until she retired.

She retired as a professor emerita in 2002, and returned to Chicago in her retirement.

== Recognition ==
Jenkins was elected to the College of Fellows of the American Institute for Medical and Biological Engineering in 1994, "for outstanding technical contributions and training of students in electrocardiology, including computer techniques for automatic arrhythmia analysis". She was also elected as an IEEE Fellow in 1995 and as a Fellow of the American College of Cardiology in 1998.

When Rada Mihalcea was named as a collegiate professor of computer science in 2020, she chose her professorship to be named in honor of Jenkins.
