= Shuly Wintner =

Israeli computer scientist and computational linguist

- Wintner in 2023
- Education: Technion – Israel Institute of Technology (Ph.D., 1997)
- Known for: Chair of EACL (2021–2022); founding chair of ACL SIG Semitic; Editor-in-Chief of Research on Language and Computation
- Scientific career
- Fields: Computational linguistics, Natural language processing
- Workplaces: University of Haifa
- Thesis: An Abstract Machine for Unification Grammars (1997)
- Doctoral advisor: Nissim Francez

Shuly Wintner is an Israeli computer scientist and professor in the Department of Computer Science at the University of Haifa. His research spans formal grammars, Hebrew morphology, computational approaches to language acquisition, code-switching, and machine translation. He is especially known for founding the ACL Special Interest Group on Computational Approaches to Semitic Languages (SIG Semitic) and for serving as Chair of the European Chapter of the Association for Computational Linguistics (EACL).

== Early life and education ==
Wintner earned his Ph.D. in computer science from the Technion – Israel Institute of Technology in 1997; his dissertation, An Abstract Machine for Unification Grammars, laid groundwork for subsequent work on typed-feature-structure grammars.

== Career ==
After joining the University of Haifa in 2000, Wintner established its Computational Linguistics Group.

- Founding chair, ACL SIG Semitic – the first ACL special-interest group dedicated to Semitic languages; he served two three-year terms (2003–2006; 2009–2012).
- Chair, EACL (2021–2022); previously programme co-chair of EACL 2006 and general chair of EACL 2014.

== Research ==
Much of Wintner’s research applies computational methods to the study of linguistic structure and language acquisition, with a strong emphasis on theoretical foundations. Key themes include:

- Hebrew morphology. His finite-state models of non-concatenative morphology remain widely cited.
- Language acquisition resources. He co-developed a morphologically annotated CHILDES corpus of Hebrew, enabling quantitative studies of first-language development.
- Code-switching. Recent work provides large-scale evidence for lexical triggers of bilingual code-switching.
- Translationese and MT. He investigates the systematic properties of translated language and their implications for computational models of translation.

== Books ==
- Nissim Francez; Shuly Wintner (2012). Unification Grammars. Cambridge University Press. ISBN 978-1-107-01417-6. The book was reviewed in Computational Linguistics.

== Selected articles ==
- Yael Cohen-Sygal, Shuly Wintner. Finite-State Registered Automata for Non-Concatenative Morphology. Computational Linguistics 32 (1), 2006, pp. 49–82. https://doi.org/10.1162/coli.2006.32.1.49.
- "Improving statistical machine translation by adapting translation models to translationese." Computational Linguistics 39 (4), 2013.
- "Shared Lexical Items as Triggers of Code Switching." TACL 11, 2023.

== Professional service ==
- Chair, European Chapter of the ACL (2021–2022)
- Founding Chair, ACL SIG Semitic (2003–2006; 2009–2012)
- General Chair, EACL 2014 (Gothenburg, Sweden)
- Programme Co-Chair, EACL 2006 (Trento, Italy)
- Editor-in-Chief, Research on Language and Computation (2003–2009)
