= Zhejiang International Studies University =

University in Hangzhou, China

- 浙江外国语学院 (Chinese)
- Motto: 明德弘毅，博雅通达
- Motto in English: striving for moral integrity and academic excellence
- Type: Public
- President: Hong Gang (洪岗)
- Location: Hangzhou, Zhejiang, China; 30.222°N 120.029°E
- Campus: urban & suburban
- Website: Zhejiang International Studies University (in English)

Chinese name
- Simplified Chinese: 浙江外国语学院
- Traditional Chinese: 浙江外國語學院
Transcriptions
Standard Mandarin
- Hanyu Pinyin: Zhèjiāng Wàiguóyǔ Xuéyuàn
- Location within Zhejiang Location within China

Zhejiang International Studies University (Chinese: 浙江外国语学院) is located in the city of Hangzhou, Zhejiang Province. Zhejiang International Studies University (ZISU), situated near the West Lake, is run by Zhejiang Provincial Government.

== Brief history ==
The university traces its roots to Qiushi Academy, founded in 1987, and Zhejiang Education Institute, founded in 1955. It started enrolling full-time undergraduates in 1994 and adopted its present name in 2010 with the authorization of the State Ministry of Education.

== Fast Facts ==
- City - Zhejiang—Hangzhou
- Degree Programs- 32
- Number of Students-5162
- International Students- 356

== School Campus ==
In Hangzhou, Zhejiang Province:

- Urban
  - Wensan Campus, the headquarters
- Suburban
  - Xiaoheshan Campus

== Colleges and Departments ==
- English Language and Culture
- European and Asian Languages and Culture
- Chinese Language and Culture
- International Business Administration
- Educational Science
- Science and Technology
- Arts
- Applied Foreign Languages
- International Education
- Adult Education and Lifelong Learning
- The Department of Social Sciences
- The Department of Physical Education

== Faculty ==
The full-time teachers total 333, including 69 professors and 110 associate professors, 81 of whom hold a Ph. D. Among them, one is the National Outstanding Teacher, seven the Provincial Outstanding Teachers, 21 the Provincial Outstanding Talents, and 11 the Provincial Young Academic Leaders. Moreover, ZISU currently employs 9 foreign experts and teachers.

== International Exchange ==
- Universiti Tunku Abdul Rahman
- Washburn University
- University of Central Arkansas
- University of Wisconsin - River Falls UWRF UWRF ZISU Partnership
- The Kyoto College of Graduate Studies for Informatics
- Josai International University
- Queensland University of Technology
- Saint Francis Xavier University
