= Rada Mihalcea =

American computer scientist

- Born: Cluj-Napoca, Romania
- Education: Technical University of Cluj-Napoca (1992), Southern Methodist University (1999, 2001), Oxford University (2010)
- Occupation: Professor at University of Michigan
- Known for: TextRank Algorithm; Natural Language Processing; Computational Social Science; Multimodal Interaction

Rada Mihalcea is the Janice M. Jenkins Collegiate Professor of Computer Science and Engineering at the University of Michigan. She has made significant contributions to natural language processing, multimodal processing, computational social science, and AI for Social Good. With Paul Tarau, she invented the TextRank Algorithm, which is a classic algorithm widely used for text summarization.

== Career ==
Mihalcea has a Ph.D. in Computer Science and Engineering from Southern Methodist University (2001) and a Ph.D. in Linguistics, Oxford University (2010). In 2017 she was named Director of the Artificial Intelligence Laboratory at University of Michigan, Computer Science and Engineering. In 2018, Mihalcea was elected as vice president for the Association for Computational Linguistics (ACL). In 2021, she was elected the president for ACL. She is a professor of Computer Science and Engineering at the University of Michigan, where she also leads the Language and Information Technologies (LIT) Lab. Before joining UofM, she was a professor at North Texas University between 2002-2013.

A prolific researcher, Mihalcea has authored or coauthored over 500 articles since 1998 on topics ranging from semantic analysis of text to lie detection. Her work has been cited over 50,000 times on Google Scholar, which made her one of the most cited scholars in Multimodal Interaction and Computational Social Science.

In 2008, Mihalcea received the Presidential Early Career Award for Scientists and Engineers (PECASE) She is an ACM Fellow (since 2019), AAAI Fellow (since 2021), and ACL Fellow (since 2025).

Mihalcea is an outspoken promoter of diversity in computer science. She also supports an expansion of the traditional analysis of educational success, which tends to focus on academic behaviour, to include student life, personality and background outside of the classroom. Mihalcea leads Girls Encoded, a program designed to develop the pipeline of women in computer science as well as to retain the women who have entered into the program.

== Awards ==
- Elected to American Academy of Arts & Sciences, 2026
- ACL Fellow, 2025 "for significant contributions to graph-based language processing, computational social science, and the advancement of NLP for social good."
- AAAI Fellow, 2021 "for significant contributions to natural language processing and computational social science".
- ACM Fellow, 2019 "for contributions to natural language processing, with innovations in data-driven and graph-based language processing".
- Sarah Goddard Power Award, 2019.
- Carol Hollenshead Award, 2018.
- Presidential Early Career Award for Scientists and Engineers (PECASE), 2009. Awarded by President Barack Obama.

== Research ==
Mihalcea is known for her research in natural language processing, multimodal processing, computational social sciences. In a collaboration she leads at the University of Michigan, Mihalcea has created software that can detect human lying. In a study of video clips of high profile court cases, a computer was more accurate at detecting deception than human judges.

Mihalcea's lie-detection software uses machine learning techniques to analyze video clips of actual trials. In her 2015 study, the team used clips from The Innocence Project, a national organization that works to reexamine cases where individuals were tried without the benefit of DNA testing with the aim of exonerating wrongfully convicted individuals. After identifying common human gestures, they transcribed the audio from the video clips of trials and analyzed how often subjects labeled deceptive used various words and phrases. The system was 75% accurate in identifying which subjects were deceptive among 120 videos. That puts Mihalcea's algorithm on par with the most commonly accepted form of lie detection, polygraph tests, which are roughly 85 percent accurate when testing guilty people and 56 percent accurate when testing the innocent. She notes there are still improvements to be made — in particular to account for cultural and demographic differences. A possibly unique advantage of Mihalcea's study was the real world, high stakes nature of the footage analyzed in the study. In laboratory experiments, it is difficult to create a setting that motivates people to truly lie.

In 2018, Mihalcea and her collaborators worked on an algorithm-based system that identifies linguistic cues in fake news stories. It successfully found fakes up to 76% of the time, compared to a human success rate of 70%.

== Publications ==
=== Books ===
- Rada Mihalcea and Dragomir Radev, Graph-based Natural Language Processing and Information Retrieval, Cambridge U. Press, 2011.
- Gabe Ignatow and Rada Mihalcea, Text Mining: A Guidebook for the Social Sciences, SAGE, 2016.
- Gabe Ignatow and Rada Mihalcea, An Introduction to Text Mining: Research Design, Data Collection, and Analysis, SAGE, 2017.

=== Journals and conferences ===
- Textrank: Bringing order into text. R. Mihalcea, P. Tarau. Proceedings of the 2004 conference on empirical methods in natural language processing. 2004
- Corpus-based and knowledge-based measures of text semantic similarity. R. Mihalcea, C. Corley, C. Strapparava. AAAI 6, 775-780. 2006
- Wikify!: linking documents to encyclopedic knowledge. R. Mihalcea, A. Csomai. Proceedings of the sixteenth ACM conference on Conference on information and information management. 2007
- Learning to identify emotions in text. C. Strapparava, R. Mihalcea. Proceedings of the 2008 ACM symposium on Applied computing, 1556-1560. 2008
- Semeval-2007 task 14: Affective text. C. Strapparava, R. Mihalcea. Proceedings of the Fourth International Workshop on Semantic Evaluations. 2007
- Learning multilingual subjective language via cross-lingual projections. R. Mihalcea, C. Banea, J. Wiebe. Proceedings of the 45th annual meeting of the association of computational linguistics. 2007
- Graph-based ranking algorithms for sentence extraction, applied to text summarization. R. Mihalcea. Proceedings of the ACL Interactive Poster and Demonstration Sessions. 2004
- Falcon: Boosting knowledge for answer engines. S. Harabagiu, D. Moldovan, M. Pasca, R. Mihalcea, M. Surdeanu, Razvan Bunescu, Roxana Girju, Vasile Rus, Paul Morarescu. TREC 9, 479-488. 2000
- Measuring the semantic similarity of texts. C. Corley, R. Mihalcea. Proceedings of the ACL workshop on empirical modeling of semantic equivalence and entailment. 2005
- R Mihalcea (2007). "Using wikipedia for automatic word-sense disambiguation". Human Language Technologies 2007: The Conference of the North American Chapter of the Association for Computational Linguistics; Proceedings of the Main Conference. - see also Word-sense disambiguation
- Unsupervised graph-based word sense disambiguation using measures of word semantic similarity. R. Sinha, R. Mihalcea. International Conference on Semantic Computing (ICSC 2007), 363-369. 2007

== Personal life ==
Mihalcea was born in Cluj-Napoca, Romania, where she attended the Technical University of Cluj-Napoca.

She can speak Romanian, English, Italian, and French.

Mihalcea has two children - Zara (b. 2009) and Caius (b. 2013). They were both born in Dallas, Texas.

She is married to an associate professor of engineering at the University of Michigan–Flint - Mihai Burzo. They met while they were both completing Ph.D.s at Southern Methodist University in 2001 and have often collaborated on research, such as the 2015 study on lie detection.
