= Simon Haykin =

Canadian electrical engineer (1931–2025)

Simon Haykin (January 6, 1931 – April 13, 2025) was a Kurdish electrical engineer noted for his pioneering work in Adaptive Signal Processing with emphasis on applications to Radar Engineering and Telecom Technology. He was a Distinguished University Professor at McMaster University in Hamilton, Ontario, Canada.

== Life and career ==
Simon Haykin was born on January 6, 1931 as Sahir Sabir Hakim in Kirkuk, Iraq. He received BSc (First-Class Honours) (1953); Ph.D. (1956), and DSc. (1967), degrees-all in Electrical Engineering from University of Birmingham, UK (England). He was a Fellow of the Royal Society of Canada, and a Fellow of the Institute of Electrical and Electronics Engineers for contributions to signal processing, communications theory, and electrical engineering education. In 2002 he became a recipient of Henry Booker Gold Medal from URSI and in 1999 received Hon. Degree of Doctor of Technical Science from ETH Zurich, Switzerland, and many other medals and prizes.

In mid-1980s, Haykin shifted the thrust of his research effort in the direction of neural computation, which was re-emerging at that time and intrinsically resembled Adaptive Signal Processing. All along, he had a vision of revisiting fields of radar engineering and telecom technology from a brand new perspective. That vision became a reality in early years of this century with publication of two seminal journal papers:

- Cognitive Radio: Brain-empowered Wireless communications”, which appeared in IEEE J. Selected Areas in Communications, Feb. 2005.
- Cognitive Radar: A Way of the Future”, which appeared in the IEEE J. Signal Processing, Feb. 2006.

Cognitive Radio and Cognitive Radar are two parts of an integrative field: Cognitive Dynamic Systems, research into which became his career.

Haykin died on April 13, 2025, at the age of 94.

== Honours and awards ==
- Fellow of the Royal Society of Canada
- Fellow of the Institute of Electrical and Electronics Engineers
- Henry Booker Gold Medal from the International Union of Radio Science, 2002
- Honorary Doctor of Technical Sciences from ETH Zurich, Switzerland, 1999
- 2016 IEEE James H. Mulligan Jr. Education Medal

== Books ==
S. Haykin, Adaptive Filter Theory, 5th Edition, Prentice Hall, 2013.

T. Adali and S. Haykin (editors), Adaptive Signal Processing: Next Generation Solutions, Wiley, 2010.

M. Sellathurai and S. Haykin, Space-Time Layered Information Processing for Wireless Communications, Wiley, IEEE Press, 2009.

S. Haykin, Neural Networks and Learning Machines (3rd Edition), Prentice Hall, 2009.

S. Haykin and M. Reed, Statistical Communication Theory, Wiley.

S. Haykin and M. Moher, Introduction to Analog and Digital Communications, Second Edition, Wiley.

S. Haykin and M. Moher, Modern Wireless Communications: Prentice-Hall 2004.

S. Haykin and B. Van Veen, Signals and Systems, Second Edition, Wiley, 2003.

S. Haykin and B. Widrow, (eds.), Least Mean-Square Filters: New insights and developments, Wiley-Interscience, 2002.

S. Haykin, Adaptive Filter Theory, 4th Edition, Prentice Hall, 2002.

S. Haykin and B. Kosko (ed.), Intelligent Signal Processing, IEEE Press, 2001

P. Yee and S. Haykin, Regularized Radial Basis Function Networks, Wiley, 2001

S. Haykin, Communication Systems, Fourth Edition, Wiley, 2001.

S. Haykin (ed.), Unsupervised Adaptive Filtering, Vol. I and II, Wiley, 2000

S. Haykin and S.Puthusserypady, Chaotic Dynamics of Sea Clutter, Wiley, 1999.

S. Haykin, Neural Networks: A Comprehensive Foundation, 2nd Edition, Prentice-Hall, 1999.

S. Haykin and B. Van Veen, “Signals and Systems”, Wiley, 1998

S. Haykin, “Adaptive Filter Theory”, 3rd Edition, Prentice-Hall, 1996.

S. Haykin (editor), Advances in Spectrum Analysis and Array Processing, Vol. III, Prentice-Hall, 1994.

S. Haykin, “Communications Systems”, Third Edition, Wiley, 1994.

S. Haykin, E. Lewis, K. Raney, and J. Rossiter, editors, “Remote Sensing of Sea Ice”, Wiley-Interscience, 1994.

S. Haykin (editor), “Blind Deconvolution”, Prentice-Hall, 1994.

S. Haykin and A. Steinhardt, “Radar Detection and Estimation”, Wiley, 1992.

S. Haykin, J. Litva, and T. Shepherd (editors), “Radar Array Processing”, Springer-Verlag, 1992.

S. Haykin, “Adaptive Filter Theory”, Second Edition, Prentice Hall, 1991.

S. Haykin (editor), “Advances in Spectrum Estimation and Array Processing”. Volumes I and II, Prentice-Hall, 1991.

S. Haykin, “An Introduction to Analog and Digital Communications”, Wiley, 1989.

S. Haykin, “Modern Filters”, Macmillan, 1989.

S. Haykin, “Digital Communications”, Wiley, 1988.

S. Haykin (editor), “Selected Topics in Signal Processing”, Prentice-Hall, 1988.

E. Lewis, B. Currie and S. Haykin, “Surface-based Radar Detection and Classification of Sea Ice”, Research Studies Press Ltd. (United Kingdom), 1987.

S. Haykin, “Adaptive Filter Theory”, Prentice-Hall, 1986.

S. Haykin, “Array Signal Processing”, Prentice-Hall, 1984.

S. Haykin, “Communications Systems”, Second Edition, Wiley, 1983.

S. Haykin (editor), “Nonlinear Methods of Spectral Analysis”, Second Edition, Springer-Verlag, 1983.

S. Haykin (editor), “Array Processing: Applications to Radar”, Dowden, Hutchison and Ross, 1980.

S. Haykin (editor), “Detection and Estimation: Applications to Radar”, Dowden, Hutchison and Ross, 1979.

S. Haykin, “Nonlinear Methods of Spectral Analysis:, Springer-Verlag, 1979.

S. Haykin, “Communications Signals and Systems”, Wiley, 1978.
