= Ted Bastin =

Edward William "Ted" Bastin (8 January 1926 – 15 October 2011) was an English physicist and mathematician who held doctorate degrees in mathematics from Queen Mary College, London University and physics from King's College, Cambridge, to which he won an Isaac Newton studentship. For a time, he was visiting fellow at Stanford University, California and a research fellow, King's College, Cambridge, England.

The boats stored at the River Cam boathouse, King's College, Cambridge, include "Ted", the lightweight wooden scull named after Ted Bastin, who won races in it for King's from 1950 to 1953.

== Work ==
Bastin’s research specialties included the foundations of physics, especially the discrete and finite aspects of quantum mechanics and relativity. He believed that a view of physical space in which space is defined not as a continuum but as a finite set of points was capable of resolving the clash between the continuum aspect of the classic theory of relativity and the discrete aspect of quantum physics. He was strongly influenced by Eddington's view that the various dimensionless and cosmological constants such as the fine structure constant had a unique status or significance as constraints upon the possible values of the natural atomic and cosmological constants of which they are ratios, and hence on all possible measurements. Along with Frederick Parker-Rhodes, Clive W. Kilmister and John Amson, Ted Bastin is noted for the discovery of, and research on applications of, the so-called combinatorial hierarchy which defines this view of space. While at the Cambridge Language Research Unit (founded by Margaret Masterman) he and Parker-Rhodes used Maurice Wilkes' EDSAC to compute the combinatorial hierarchy. However, the theory gave rise to no testable predictions and was generally regarded as too speculative.

He was on firmer ground in his objection to the (then generally accepted) Copenhagen interpretation of quantum theory, and also to other conceptual difficulties, such as the nature and role of observation and measurement, which he regarded as contributing to logical muddle arising from confusing ontological and epistemological aspects of the theory. His assessment of the philosophical difficulties and obscurities in quantum theory that had to be overcome before any change in the basic structure could take place was penetrating; it was only his attempt to overcome the formal difficulties that failed.

He collaborated with David Bohm to organize the "Quantum Theory and Beyond" colloquium at Cambridge University in July 1968, chaired by O. R. Frisch. The colloquium was sponsored by the Royal Society, Carnegie Institution of Science, and Theoria Inc., and resulted in a book by the same name. Bastin worked with David Bohm on other theoretical physics projects as well, particularly by having discussions with the latter on his theory of hidden variables in quantum theory.

Bastin was a founding member, with H. Pierre Noyes, Clive W. Kilmister, John Amson and Frederick Parker-Rhodes, of the Alternative Natural Philosophy Association (ANPA), Cambridge, England. Their first meeting was held in the autumn of 1979 at Prof. Kilmister's "Red Tiles Cottage " near Lewes. The organization was joined in 1980 by David McGoveran and Tom Etter, among others. Meetings were first held annually at King's College, Cambridge and now continue annually at Westcott House.

Bastin gave serious attention to paranormal phenomena, notably the psychokinesis of Uri Geller. and psychic surgeon Zé Arigó.

Bastin was also, with Margaret Masterman, Dorothy Emmet and R. B. Braithwaite a founding member of the Epiphany Philosophers in Cambridge, a society founded to pursue links between science and religion, and which was based on the journal Theoria to Theory.

Bastin died in Wales in 2011, he was survived by his wife and son.

== Publications ==
- A Sequential Logic for Information Structuring in "Mathematics of a Hierarchy of Brouwerian Operations" with A. F. Parker-Rhodes (Fort Belvoir Defense Technical Information Center 01 MAY 1965).
- Quantum Theory and Beyond. Ted Bastin ed. Cambridge University Press, 1971 (papers from the Quantum Theory and Beyond colloquium). ISBN 0-521-07956-X
- The Origin of Discrete Particles (Series on Knots and Everything, vol. 42) by T. Bastin and C. W. Kilmister (7 Aug 2009) "The Origin of Discrete Particles (Series on Knots and Everything, vol. 42)". World Scientific Publishing.
- Combinatorial Physics (Series on Knots and Everything, vol. 9) by Ted Bastin and C. W. Kilmister (Oct 1995) "Combinatorial Physics (Series on Knots and Everything, vol. 9)". World Scientific Publishing Co., Inc. ISBN 981-02-2212-2
- "A Clash of Paradigms in Physics", in The Encyclopedia of Ignorance (Ronald Duncan and Miranda Weston-Smith eds.) 1978 The Encyclopedia of Ignorance. Pocket Books. 1978. ISBN 0671790870. ISBN 0-671-79087-0
