= Frederick Parker-Rhodes =

British scientist

Arthur Frederick Parker-Rhodes
- Born: 21 November 1914; Newington, Yorkshire
- Died: 2 March 1987 (aged 72)
- Known for: Contributions to computational linguistics, combinatorial physics, bit-string physics, plant pathology, and mycology
- Scientific career
- Fields: Mycology, Plant Pathology, Mathematics, Linguistics, Computer Science
- Author abbrev. (botany): Park.-Rhodes

Arthur Frederick Parker-Rhodes (21 November 1914 – 2 March 1987) was an English linguist, plant pathologist, computer scientist, mathematician, mystic, and mycologist, who also introduced original theories in physics.

== Background & education ==
Arthur Frederick Parker-Rhodes was born in Newington, Yorkshire on 21 November 1914. He was educated at Marlborough College and Magdalene College, Cambridge, from where he graduated in 1934 and subsequently received his PhD. Being of independent means, he was able to pursue a variety of interests. He married author and political activist Damaris Parker-Rhodes and the couple earned a reputation as "bohemians" and eccentrics. They were both members of the Communist Party (Klaus Fuchs stayed with them in Cambridge, Alan Nunn May was a local friend), they became disillusioned with communism and in 1948 joined the Society of Friends. They had three boys (one of whom died aged 12) and a daughter, Oriole.

== Plant pathology and mycology ==
During the Second World War, Parker-Rhodes worked as a plant pathologist at Long Ashton Research Station from where he published a series of research papers on the mechanism of fungicidal actions. His personal interest, however, was in the larger fungi, particularly agarics (mushrooms and toadstools), and he was a familiar figure at forays of the British Mycological Society in the 1940s and 1950s. He even published a statistical survey of these forays. For nearly 30 years Parker-Rhodes tutored a course on fungi at the Flatford Mill Field Studies Centre in Suffolk and, in 1950, published a popular book, Fungi, friends and foes. Subsequently, he produced papers studying the kinetics of fairy rings and a series surveying the larger fungi of Skokholm, an island off the western coast of Wales. He described several taxa new to science, including the species now known as Trechispora clanculare (Park.-Rhodes) K.H. Larss. which he found in a puffin burrow.

== Mathematical linguistics and computer science ==
Parker-Rhodes was an accomplished linguist and was able to read at least 23 languages, claiming that they became "easier after the first half-dozen". He was introduced to Chinese and formal linguistic syntax by Michael Halliday at Cambridge. Parker-Rhodes was also a mathematician, with a particular interest in statistics and applications of lattice theory. Both these areas of expertise were of use to him when he joined the Cambridge Language Research Unit, an independent research centre established in 1955 by Margaret Masterman. The unit was said to house "an extraordinary collection of eccentrics" engaged in research on language and computing, including information retrieval. Parker-Rhodes' colleagues at CLRU included Roger Needham, Karen Spärck Jones, Ted Bastin, Stuart Linney, and Yorick Wilks.

Parker-Rhodes was "an original thinker in information retrieval, quantum mechanics and computational linguistics." He wrote A Sequential Logic for Information Structuring in "Mathematics of a Hierarchy of Brouwerian Operations" with Yorick Wilks (Fort Belvoir Defense Technical Information Center 01 MAY 1965).

Parker-Rhodes also co-authored papers with Needham on the "theory of clumps" in relation to information retrieval and computational linguistics.

He wrote a book on language structure and the logic of descriptions, Inferential Semantics, published in 1978. The work analyzes sentences and longer passages into mathematical lattices (the kind in Lattice Theory, not crystal lattices) which are semantic networks. These are inferred not only from sentence syntax but also from grammatical focus and sometimes prosody. Each node the network is a concept in one or more structured conceptual dimensions (called base domains, which are also lattice structures); this places a description into a resulting abstract lattice of possible descriptions, ordered from general to specific. This structure can be used for automated inference in artificial intelligence and machine translation. He factors some of the dimensions (base domains, like a quantifier lattice, a (deep) case lattice, et al.) into sublattice-factors. Division of the lattice of possible descriptions into factors acts to divide-and-conquer the abstract lattice of all possible descriptions into simpler, independent semantic "factors" or "dimensions".

His Times obituarist, Ted Bastin, says of Parker-Rhodes' personality and scientific contribution: "One must say, in sum, that Parker-Rhodes leaves us with an enigma – a situation to which he brought his characteristic gentle and slightly amused acquiescence.".

== Spiritual and other writings ==
Parker-Rhodes influenced mathematical metaphysics with his book relating to the Combinatorial Hierarchy's remarkable correspondences to the dimensionless scaling laws of physics. His pamphlet, Wholesight: The Spirit Quest (1978), that explored mythical tales and parables in an attempt to bring science and religion together. He also produced a long poem, The Myth of the Rock, of a spiritual nature. His daughter, Oriole Parker-Rhodes, has electronically published some of the stories he told to his children, entitled Tales from the Sink. That and The Myth of the Rock are available free online at Archive.org. The library of the Society of Friends in London holds a typescript of The Wheel of Creation : An essay in Wholesight, towards a coherent model of the place of mankind in the cosmos He wrote a Key to the British basidiomycetes which is held by the library at the Royal Botanic Gardens, Kew.

== Selected scientific publications ==
- Parker-Rhodes, A.F. (1949). "The Basidiomycetes of Skokholm Island. II. Genetical implications of spores measurement in two agarics". New Phytologist 48 (2): 382–389. (subscription required)
- ________________. (1950). Fungi-friends and Foes. 140 pp. UK, London. with photographs by Peter Martin Brabazon Walker
- ________________. (1950). "The Basidiomycetes of Skokholm Island. III. Genetic isolation in Panaeolus papilionaceous". New Phytologist 49: 328–334.
- ________________. (1950). "The Basidiomycetes of Skokholm Island. IV. A case of hybridization in Psilocybe (Deconica)". New Phytologist 49 (3): 335–343. (subscription required)
- ________________. (1951). "The Basidiomycetes of Skokholm Island. V. An elementary theory of anemophilous dissemination". New Phytologist 50 (1): 84–97. (subscription required)
- ________________. (1951). "The Basidiomycetes of Skokholm Island. VII. Some floristic and ecological calculations". New Phytologist 50 (2): 227–243. (subscription required)
- ________________. (1951). "The Basidiomycetes of Skokholm Island. VI. Observations on certain uncommon species and varieties". Transactions of the British Mycological Society 34 (3): 360–367.
- ________________. (1952). "The Basidiomycetes of Skokholm Island. VIII. Taxonomic distributions". (PDF) New Phytologist 51 (2): 216–228.
- ________________. (1953). "The Basidiomycetes of Skokholm Island. IX. Response to meteorological conditions". New Phytologist 52 (1): 14–21. (subscription required)
- ________________. (1953). "The Basidiomycetes of Thetford Chase. I. Correlation with age of plantation". New Phytologist 52 (1): 65–70. (subscription required)
- ________________. (1953). "The Basidiomycetes of Skokholm Island. X. Population densities". (PDF) New Phytologist 52 (3): 273–291.
- ________________. (1954). "The Basidiomycetes of Skokholm Island. XI. Intramycelial variation in Hygrocybe turunda var. lepida". (PDF) New Phytologist 53 (1): 92–98.
- ________________. (1954). "Deme structure in higher fungi: Mycena galopus". Transactions of the British Mycological Society 37 (3): 314–320.
- ________________. (1954). "The Basidiomycetes of Skokholm Island. I. Annotated species list". Transactions of the British Mycological Society 37 (4): 324–342.
- ________________. (1955). "The Basidiomycetes of Skokholm Island. XII. Correlation with the chief plant associations". New Phytologist 54 (2): 259–276.
- ________________. (1955). "Some typical communities of Basidiomycetes". Transactions of the British Mycological Society 38 (2): 173.
- ________________. (1955). "Statistical aspects of fungus forays". Transactions of the British Mycological Society 38 (3): 283–290.
- ________________. (1955). "The Basidiomycetes of Skokholm Island". XIII. Echinotrema clanculare gen. et sp. nov." Transactions of the British Mycological Society 38 (4): 366–368.
- ________________. (1956). "Distribution of fungi in a small wood". (PDF) Annals of Botany London, N.S. 20 (78): 251–264.
- ________________. (1979). Handbook with Keys for the Identification of the Tachycarpic Hymenomycetidae, Namely All the Toadstools Hitherto Found in the British Isles. 234 pp. UK; A.F. Parker-Rhodes.
