= Epiphany Philosophers =

The Epiphany Philosophers was a group of philosophers, scientists and religious figures (priests, nuns and monks) who met regularly and published between 1950 and 2010. The focus of their endeavours was on the relationship between science and religion.

== Founders and principal players ==
The founders of the group included Margaret Masterman, Richard Braithwaite, Dorothy Emmet, Robert H. Thouless, Michael Argyle and Ted Bastin. Later members included Kwame Anthony Appiah, Fraser Watts, Rupert Sheldrake, Rowan Williams, Clive W. Kilmister, Frederick Parker-Rhodes, Jonathan Westphal and Yorick Wilks.

== Theoria to Theory ==
The group produced a quarterly journal (published by Gordon and Breach Science Publishers), Theoria to Theory: An International Journal of Philosophy, Science and Contemplative Religion, which ran to 14 volumes, between 1966 and 1981. The front matter of Volume 13 reported the journal's purpose:

Theoria to theory

Attempts to see how imaginative insight can become working theory.

Is the product of a continuing dialogue between scientific specialists and philosophers on the one hand, and contemplatives of different traditions, Eastern as well as Western, on the other.

Believes that the Christian mystical tradition—background of the whole development of Western science and technology—demands at the very least another look.

Sees an urgent need for fundamental philosophical investigation into such questions within an enlarged scientific vision, without which so much of science is simply commercially profitable or experimentally convenient.

Looks at practical attempts to use technology in enhancing life rather than impoverishing its quality.

Considers the human treatment of human beings in education, health, and work.

— Volume 13 of Theoria to Theory: An International Journal of Philosophy, Science and Contemplative Religion

== Publications ==
- Epiphany Philosophers Conference Report; privately published (1954)
- The Pardshaw Dialogues, ed. by D. M. Emmet and published in Process Studies (1987)
