= Ulmus × hollandica 'Ypreau' =

Elm cultivar

- Hybrid parentage: U. glabra × U. minor
- Cultivar: 'Ypreau'
- Origin: Belgium and northern France

The hybrid elm cultivar Ulmus × hollandica 'Ypreau' is one of a number of cultivars arising from the crossing of the Wych Elm U. glabra with a variety of Field Elm U. minor. The tree was first identified by Poederlé in Manuel De L'Arboriste Et Du Forestier Belgiques 266, 1772, as l'orme Ypreau.

== Description ==
Poederlé's 'Ypreau' was distinguished solely by its Tilia-like leaves.

== Cultivation ==
Poederlé's orme Ypreau may have been the same hybrid that was still called ypreau or ypereau in the Somme and Picardy areas in the late nineteenth century, which, according to R. H. Richens, was Ulmus × hollandica 'Major'. Richens concluded, on the basis of field studies, that Picardy was the provenance of the 'Dutch' elm planted in England. The latter also has large heart-shaped Tilia-like leaves.

== Etymology ==
The word Ypreau or ypereau was first recorded in 1432 from the Pas-de-Calais area, and found its way into Cotgrave's French-English dictionary of 1611 as a name for a large-leafed elm, as distinct from the small-leaved types of Ulmus minor in northern France. It derives from a north German word for elm, ip or iper that became iep in Dutch and iperen in Frisian, and reached French from Flemish. The tree was once commonly planted in the region of Ypres, Belgium, but does not take its name from the town.

The cultivar name 'Ypreau' has also been given to varieties of Poplar and Willow, resulting in some confusion.

== Synonymy ==
- ?Ulmus × hollandica 'Major'
