= Ulmus × hollandica 'Major' =

Elm cultivar

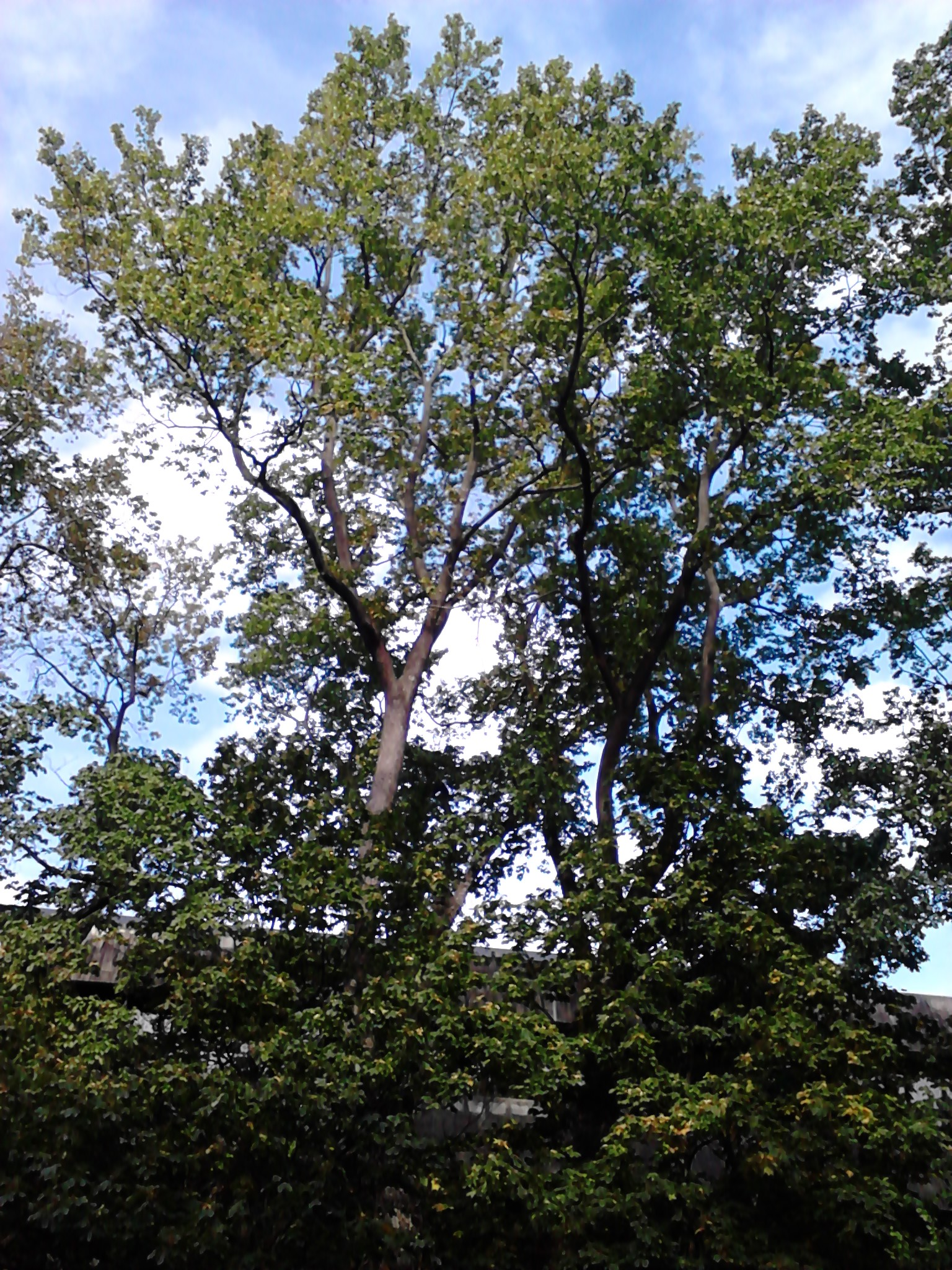
- 'Major', Fettes Row, Edinburgh
- Hybrid parentage: U. glabra × U. minor
- Cultivar: 'Major'
- Origin: northern France and Low Countries; (as cultivar) England

Ulmus × hollandica 'Major' is a distinctive cultivar that in England came to be known specifically as the Dutch Elm, although all naturally occurring Field Elm Ulmus minor × Wych Elm U. glabra hybrids are loosely termed 'Dutch elm' (U. × hollandica). It is also known by the cultivar name 'Hollandica'. Nellie Bancroft considered 'Major' either an F2 hybrid or a backcrossing with one of its parents.

According to Richens the tree was a native of Picardy and elsewhere in northern France, where it was known from the fifteenth to nineteenth centuries as ypereau or ypreau. 'Major' was said to have been introduced to England from the Netherlands in the late seventeenth century as a fashion-elm associated with William and Mary, the name 'Dutch Elm' having been coined by Queen Mary's resident botanist Dr Leonard Plukenet. Elms exported from the Netherlands to Germany in 1634 as 'Dutch elms' may have been 'Major'.

The epithet 'Major' was first adopted by Smith in Sowerby's English Botany 36: t. 2542, published in 1814, identifying the tree as Ulmus major. Krüssmann formally recognized the tree as the cultivar U. × hollandica 'Major' in 1962.

Richens (1983) states that Elwes and Henry in their account of Dutch Elm (1913) "confused Dutch Elm with English". He gives no evidence but can only have been referring to Henry's statement that "in many districts ['Major'] is the commonest tree in hedgerows". Richens was writing seventy years after Henry, after two Dutch elm disease epidemics, two world wars, and decades of urbanisation and road-widening. Henry's statement was not necessarily a case of misidentification – or an exaggeration. Elwes and Henry's account of Dutch Elm remains a pioneering one.

== Description ==
In areas unaffected by Dutch elm disease, 'Major' often attains a height of > 30 m, with a short bole and irregular, wide-spreading branches. In open-grown specimens, the canopy is less dense than that of the English elm or Wych elm. The bark of the trunk is dark and deeply fissured and, like English elm, forms irregular 'plates' in mature specimens, serving to distinguish it from the Huntingdon Elm (latticed bark), the other commonly planted U. × hollandica in the UK.

The leaves are oval, < 12 cm long by 7 cm wide, the top surface dark green and glossy, with a long serrated point at the apex. The red apetalous, perfect, wind-pollinated flowers are produced in spring in large clusters of up to 50. The obovate samarae are up to 25 mm long by 18 mm broad. The cultivar may be distinguished from other elms by the corky ridges which on mature trees occur only on the epicormic branches of the trunk. The bark of branches and twigs is otherwise smooth. On immature trees and suckers, the corky bark is more pronounced.

Elwes and Henry state that the seed is rarely viable, Bancroft that it is always sterile. The tree suckers profusely from roots. In southern Britain, 'Major' is commonly found as a sucker, sometimes in mixed hedgerows with English Elm; large Dutch Elm sucker-populations have been found in south west Wales, Cornwall, and along the Channel coast. The suckers of Dutch Elm are sometimes confused with those of English Elm, which may explain the widespread and random occurrence of the former in hedgerows in southern Britain. 'Major' comes into leaf some three weeks later than English elm, and loses its leaves some three weeks earlier, and when young, its branching is straighter, stouter and more open. It is usually more vigorous than English elm. The larger, tapering leaves, predominantly corky bark, and bold herringbone outline of Dutch Elm suckers also help to distinguish them from those of English elm.

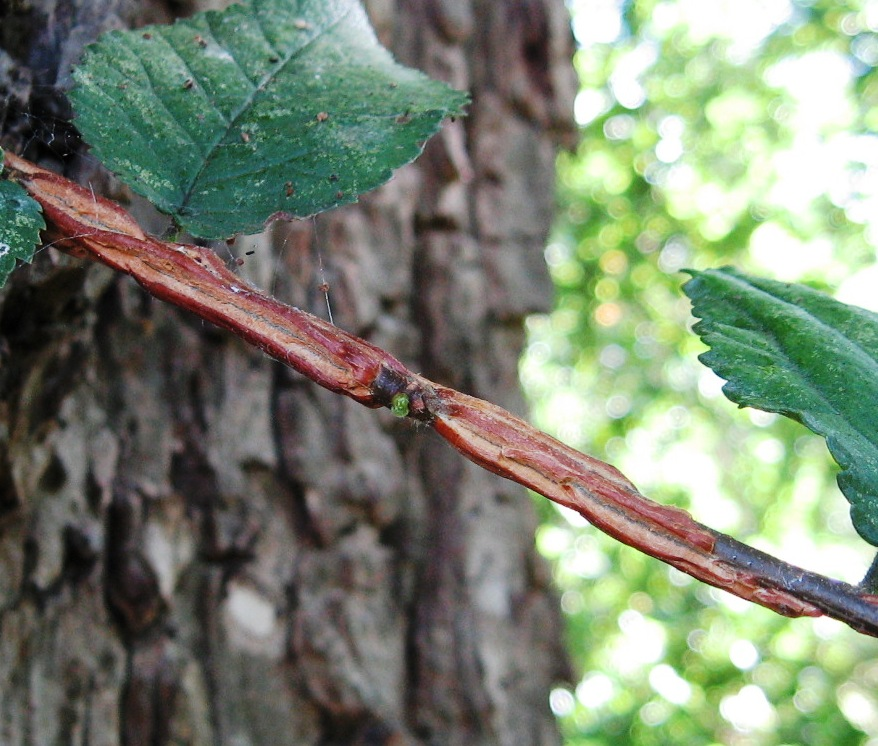
Corky wings on epicormic branchlets

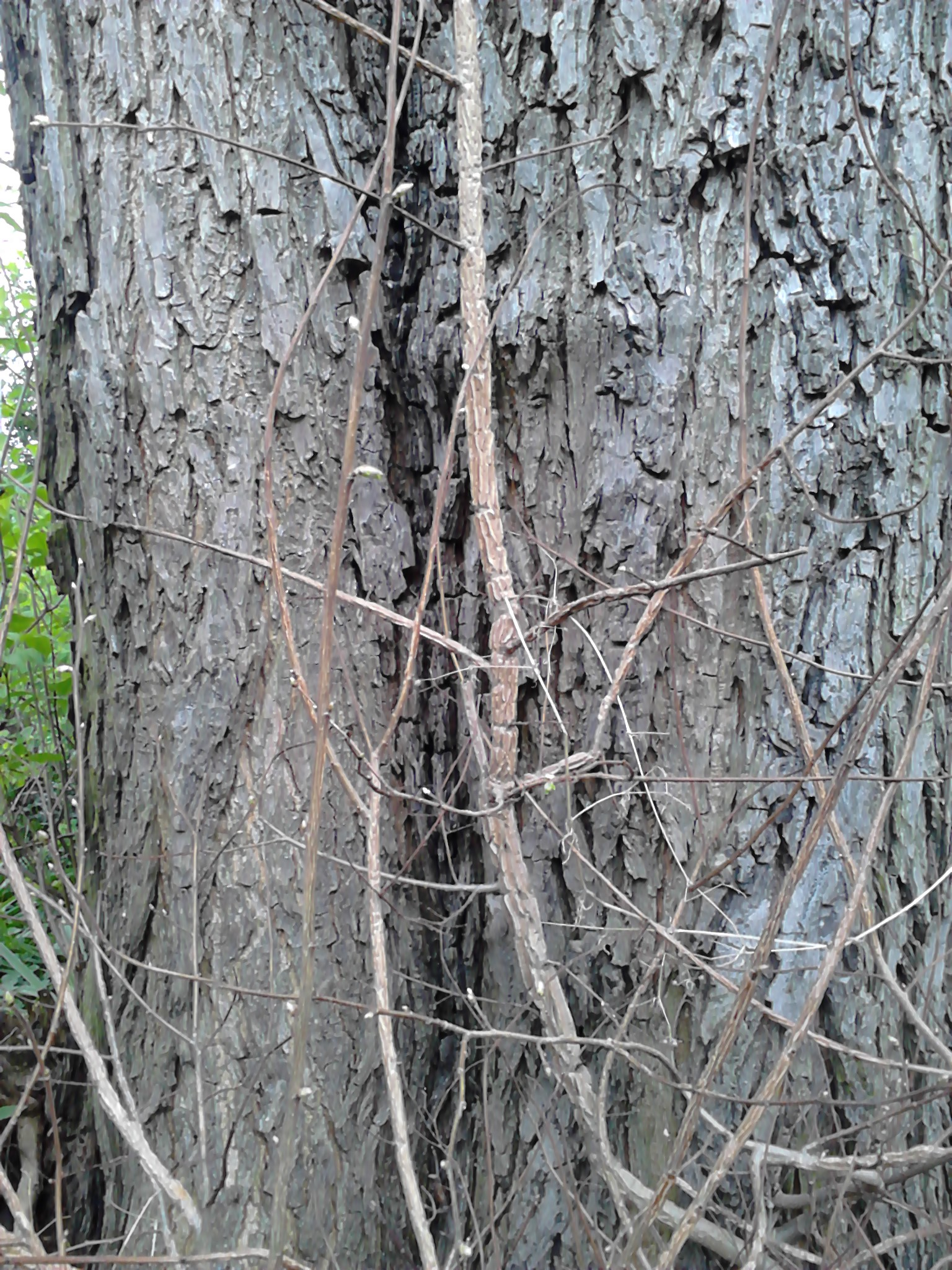
'Major' bark and corky bole-shoots

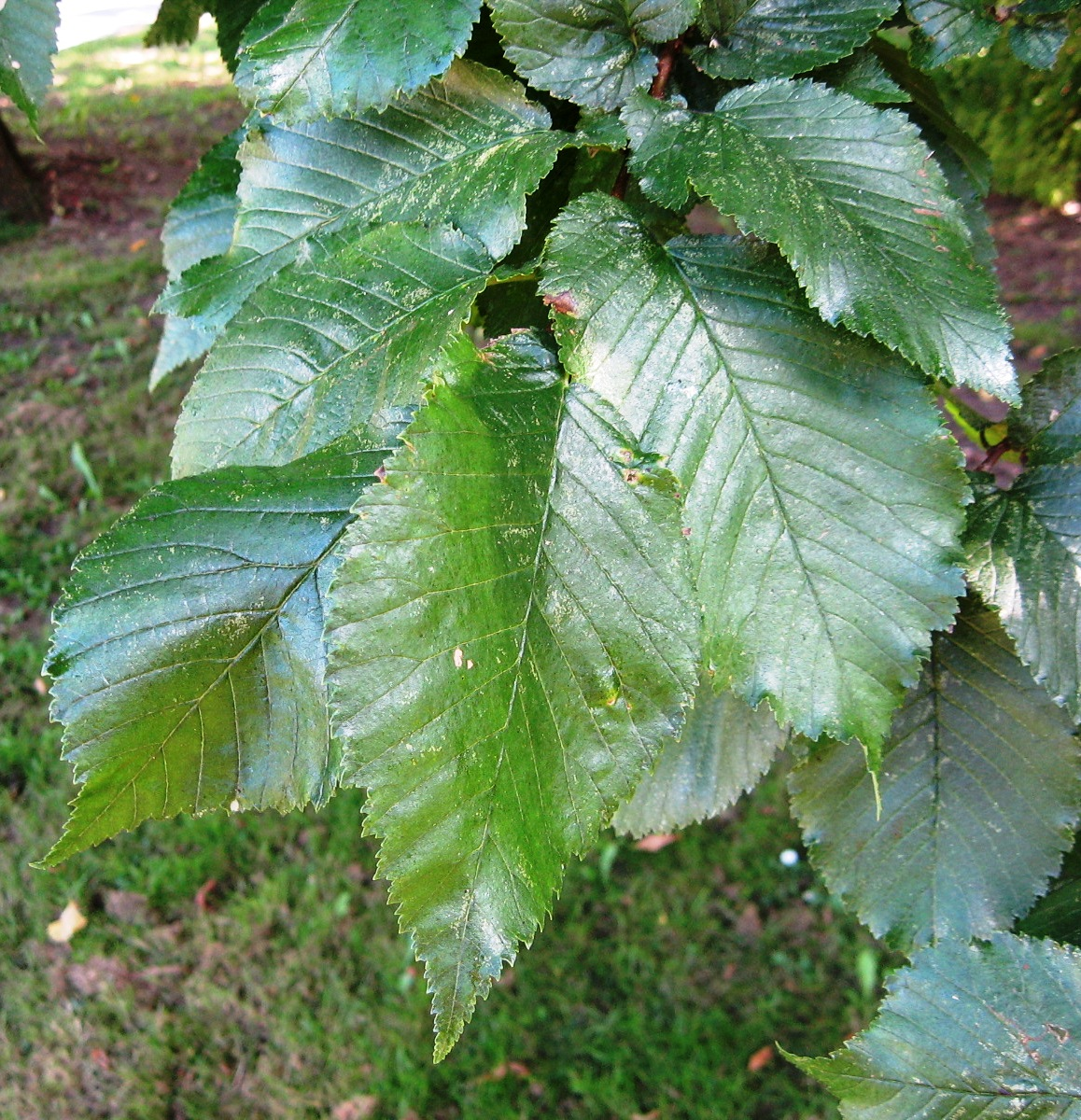
'Major' leaves showing tapering apices

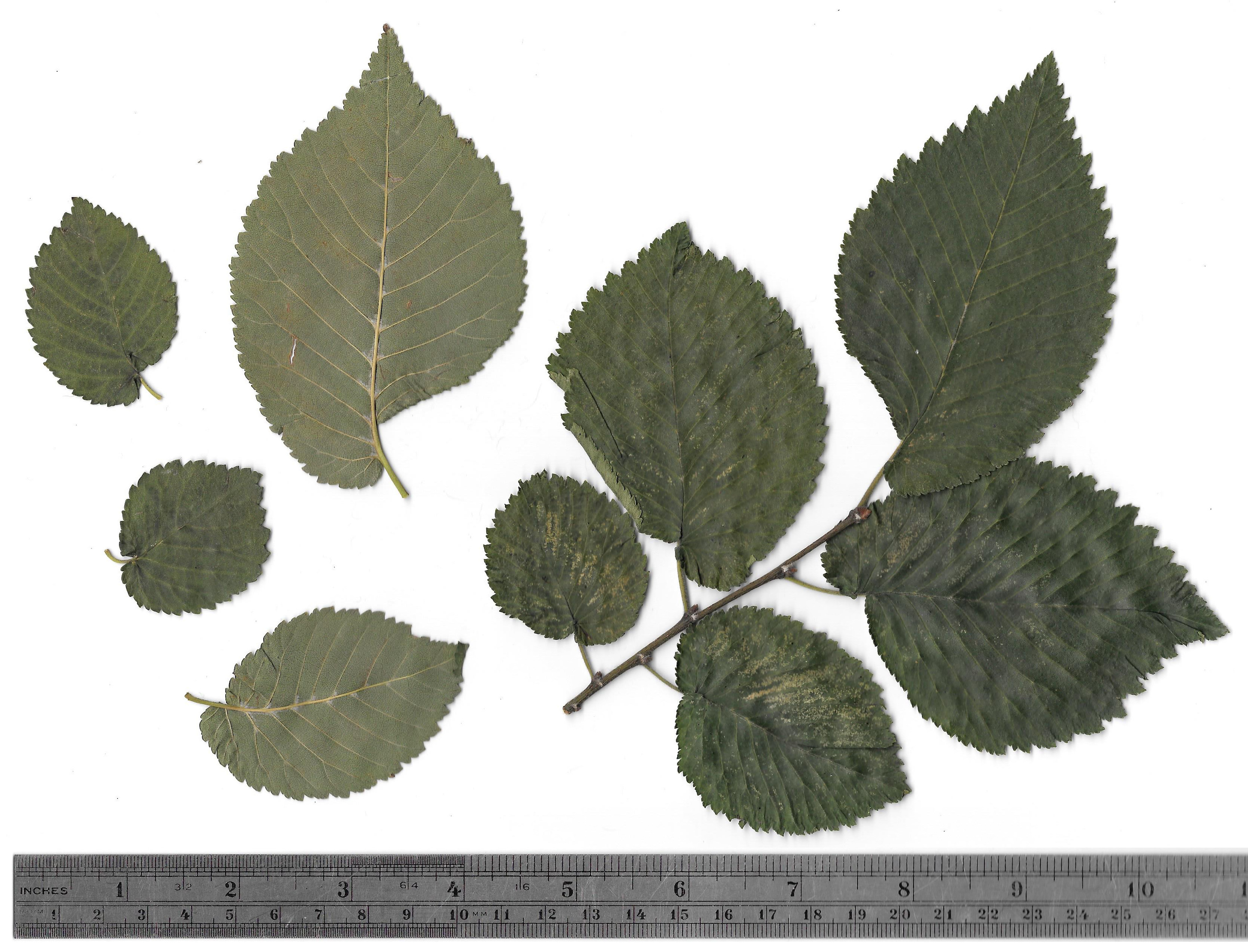
Pressed 'Major' leaves, August

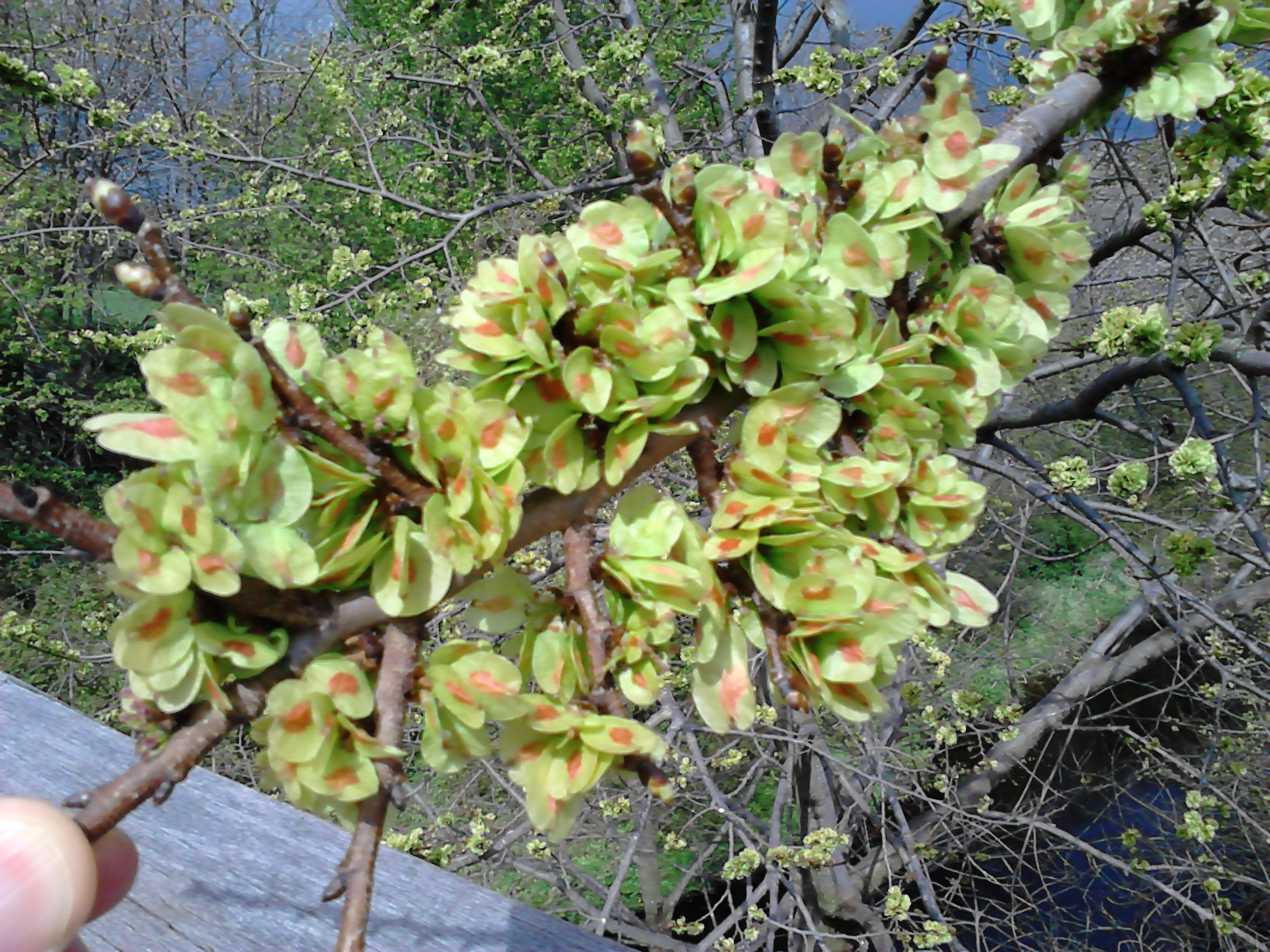
'Major' samarae

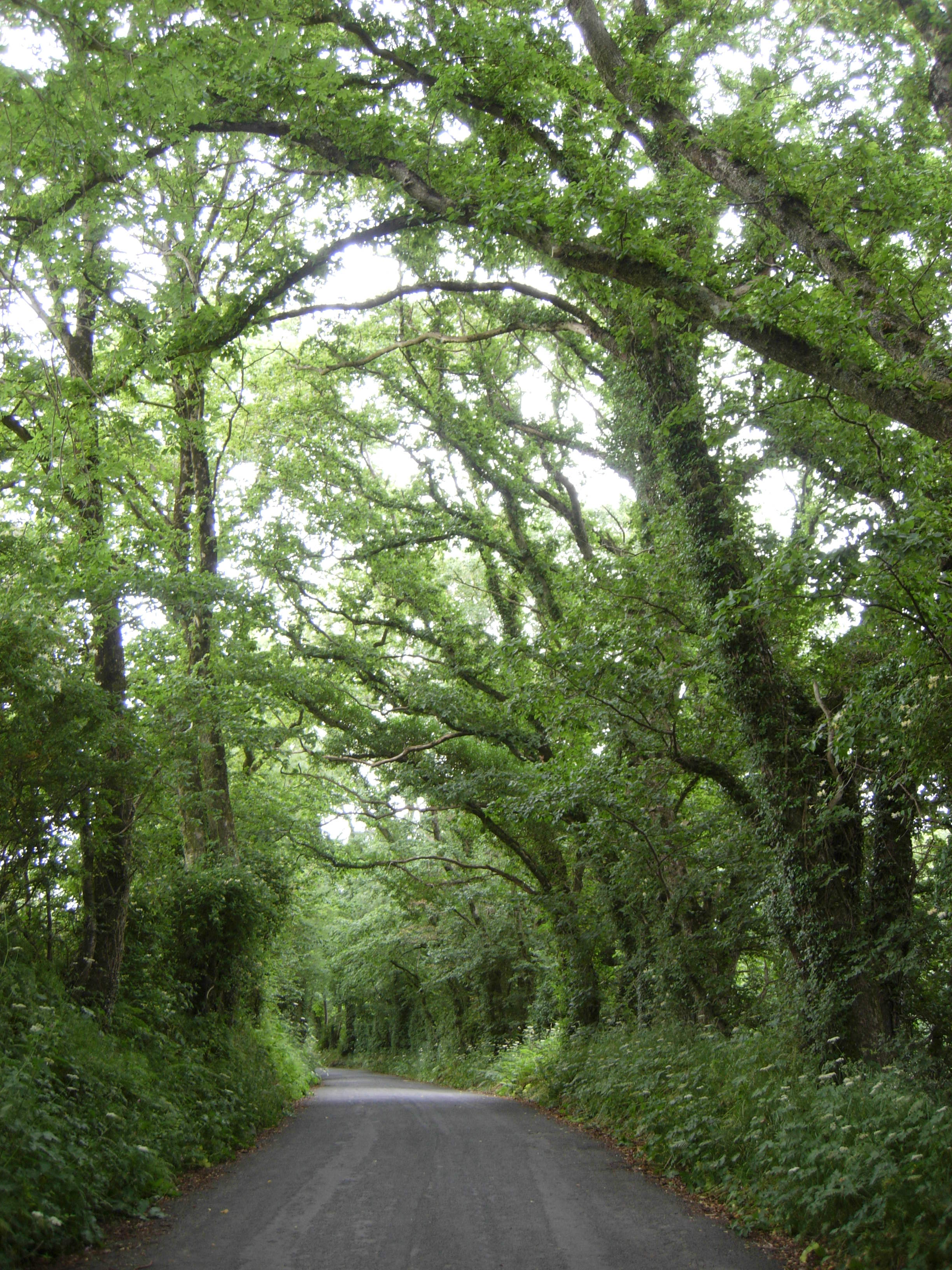
'Major' forming hedgerows, Isle of Man

== Pests and diseases ==
Ulmus × hollandica 'Major' is very susceptible to Dutch elm disease.

== Cultivation ==
The ‘Dutch’ elm quickly became popular in eighteenth-century estate plantations in England, survivors today being naturalised relics of this planting fashion; but the tree was always rare in the Netherlands, where from the eighteenth century hollandse iep (Holland elm) meant the widely planted hybrid Ulmus × hollandica Belgica (Belgian Elm). (The Ulmus hollandica gigantea listed in The Hague in the 1930s may have been 'Major'.) Ley (1910) noted that 'Major' could be found scattered throughout the lowlands of England and Wales, often in the company of English Elm; but, unlike the latter, extended into mountain valleys in South Wales up to 1000 feet. ‘Dutch’ elm was also planted in urban parks, for example in the elm-groves of Kensington Palace Gardens, and, on account of its suckering habit and quick growth, was frequently planted as the elm component in mixed coastal shelter-belts on the south coast, in Cornwall, South Wales, the Isle of Man, and East Anglia. The tree was propagated and marketed in the UK by the Hillier & Sons nursery, Winchester, Hampshire from 1949, with 101 sold in the period 1962 to 1977, when production ceased with the advent of the more virulent form of Dutch elm disease.

'Major' was introduced to Ireland, where the largest specimens were at Marlfield, County Tipperary, renowned for its elms. It was also the predominant elm in Phoenix Park, Dublin. 'Major' is known to have been marketed (as U. montana gigantea) in Poland in the 19th century by the Ulrich nursery, Warsaw, and may still survive in Eastern Europe. In 1963 Heybroek reported 'Major' present in Gottorf Castle in Schleswig, speculating that the specimen may have been regrowth or repropagation from elms known to have been introduced to the city in the late 17th century by the castle's Dutch gardener.

Ulmus suberosa major, 'The Dutch cork-barked elm', was in US nurseries by the mid-19th century. Arnold Arboretum reported in 1915 that in the USA (as in the UK by the 20th century), 'Major' was sometimes confused with English Elm. 'Major' is grown at several arboreta and along the streets of Portland, Oregon. The cultivar is also grown in parks and avenues in Australia, notably in Melbourne, and in New Zealand.

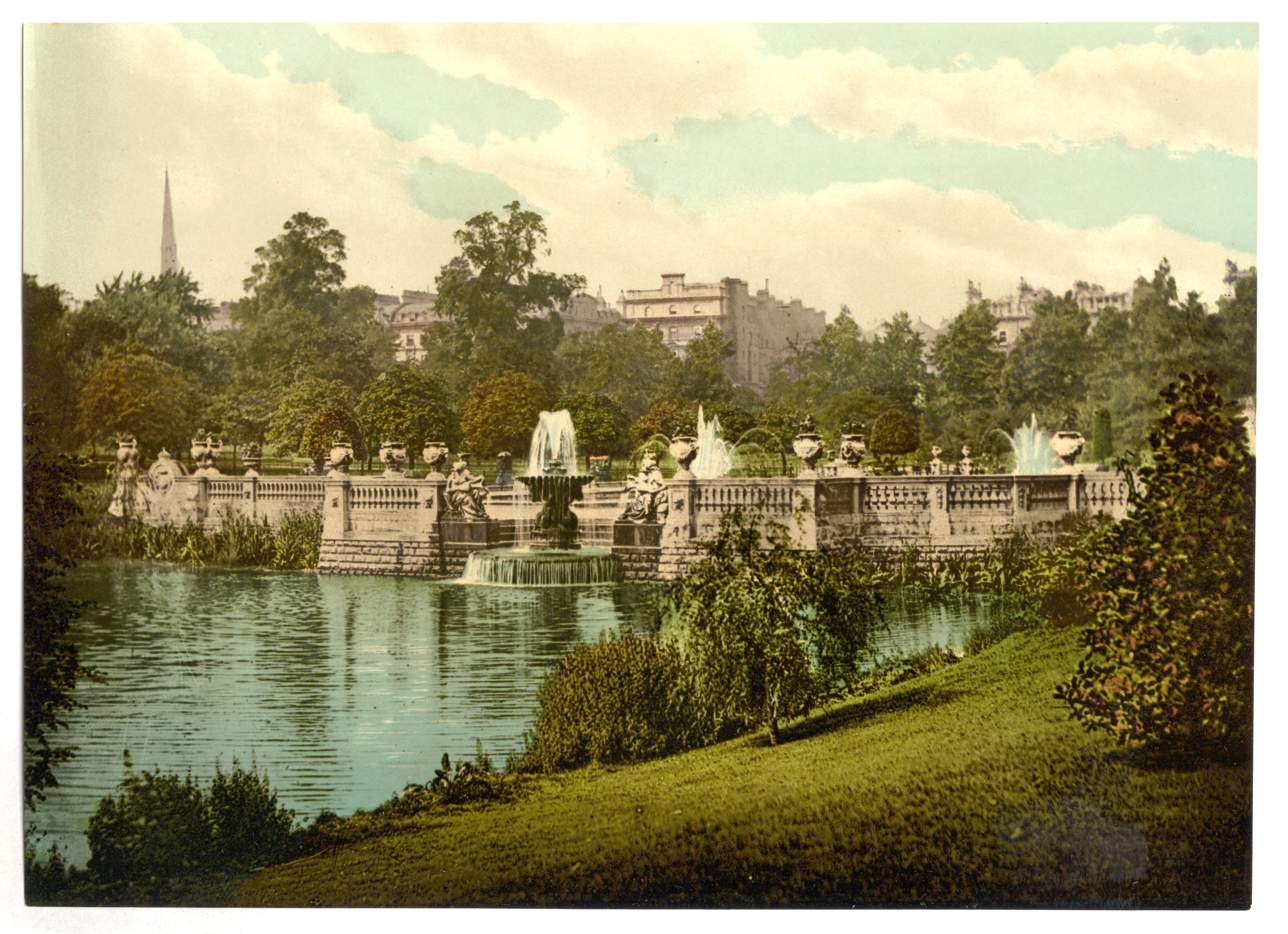
Dutch Elms, Kensington Gardens, London, c.1890

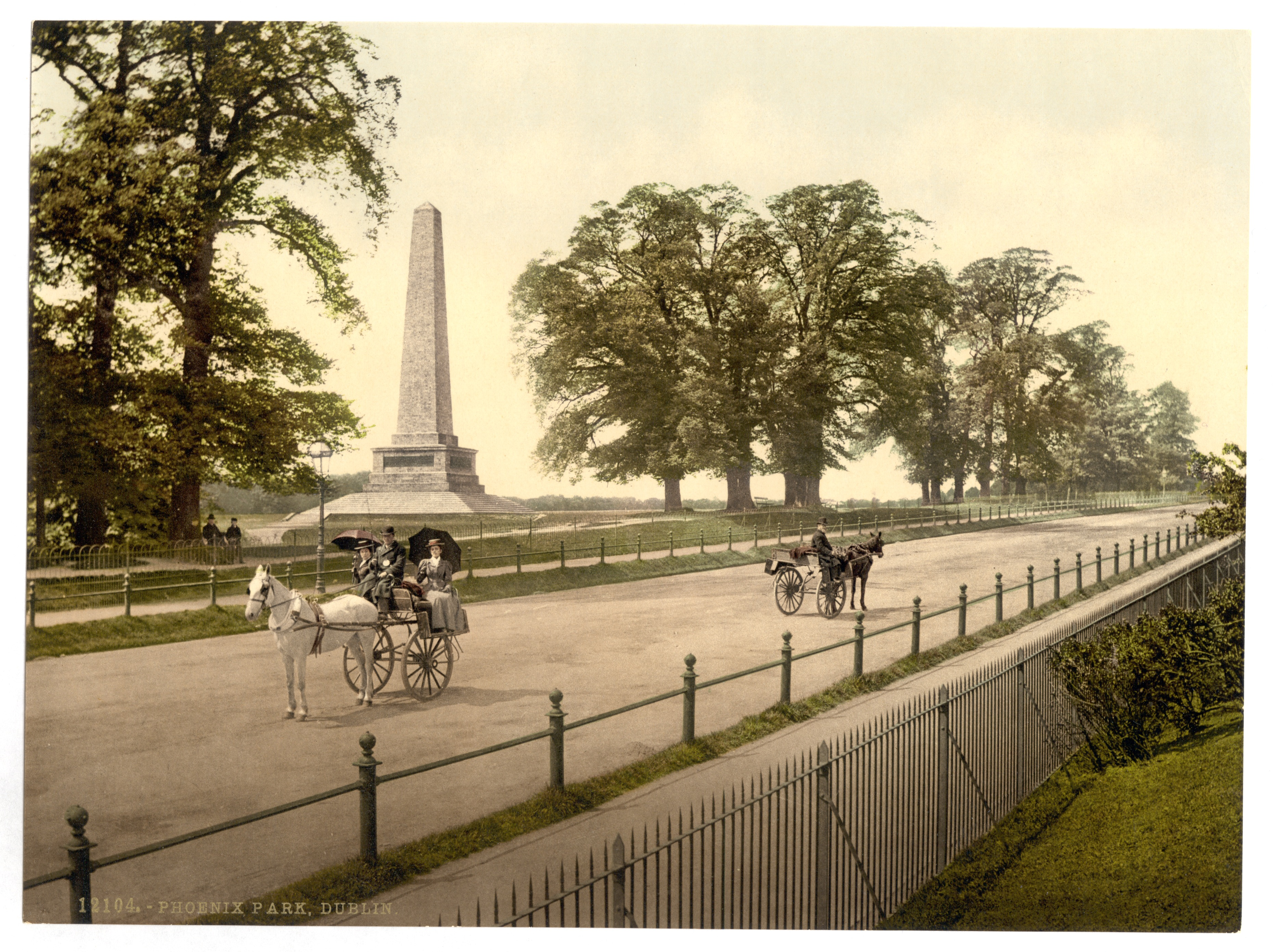
Dutch Elms, Phoenix Park, Dublin, c.1890

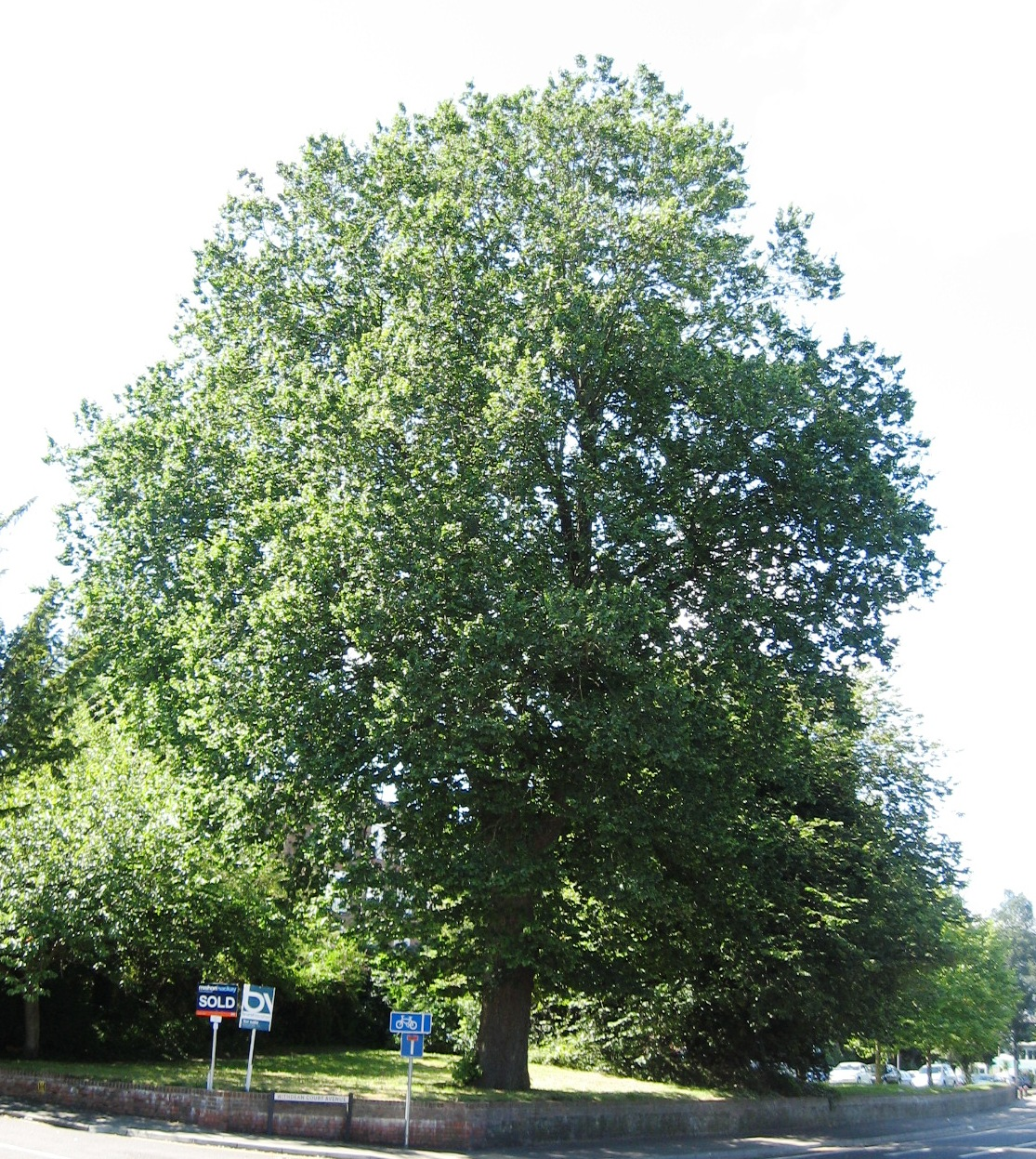
'Major', Withdean Court Road, Brighton; denser form the result of pruning

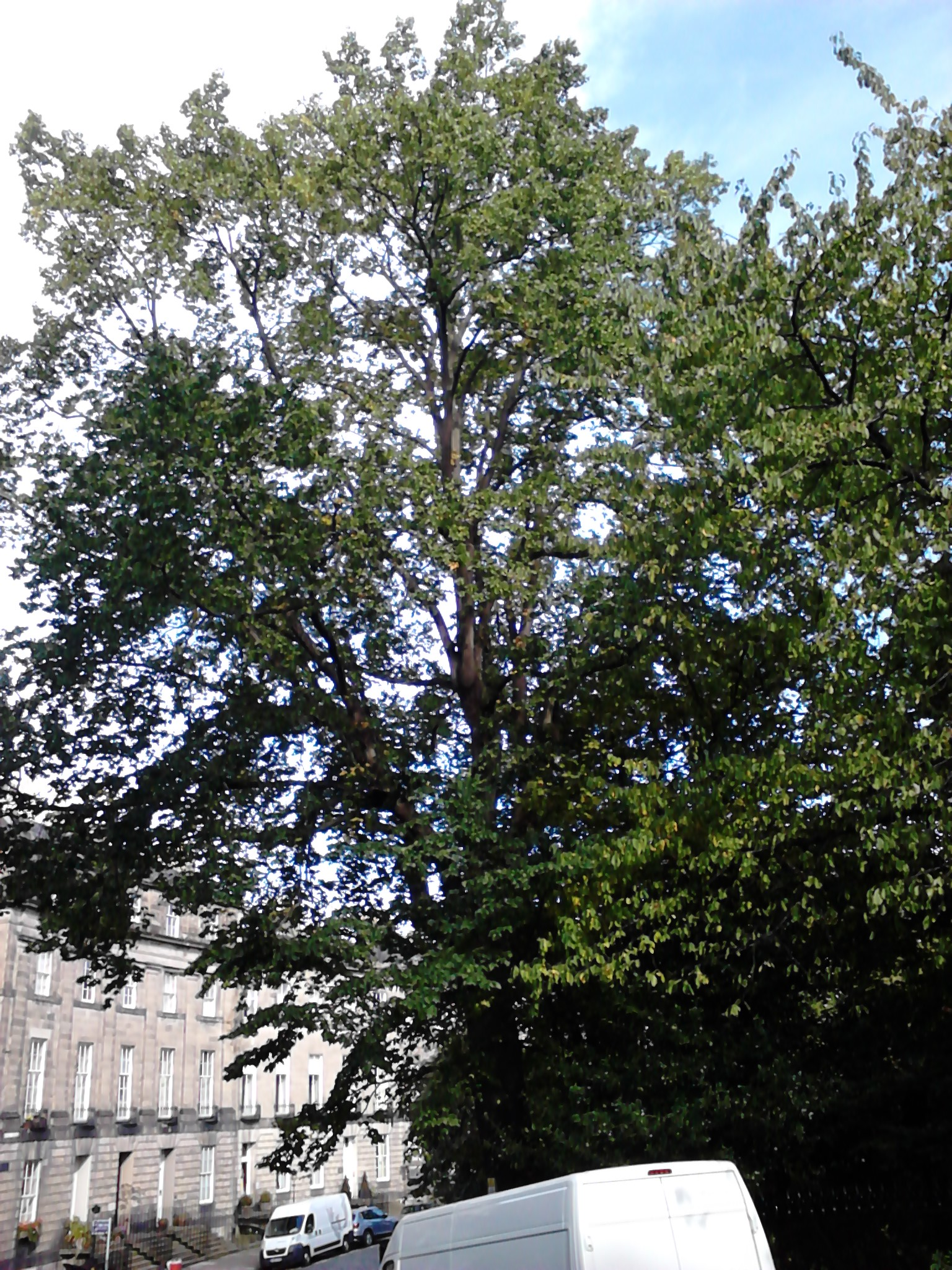
'Major', fan-headed after pollarding, Royal Circus, Edinburgh

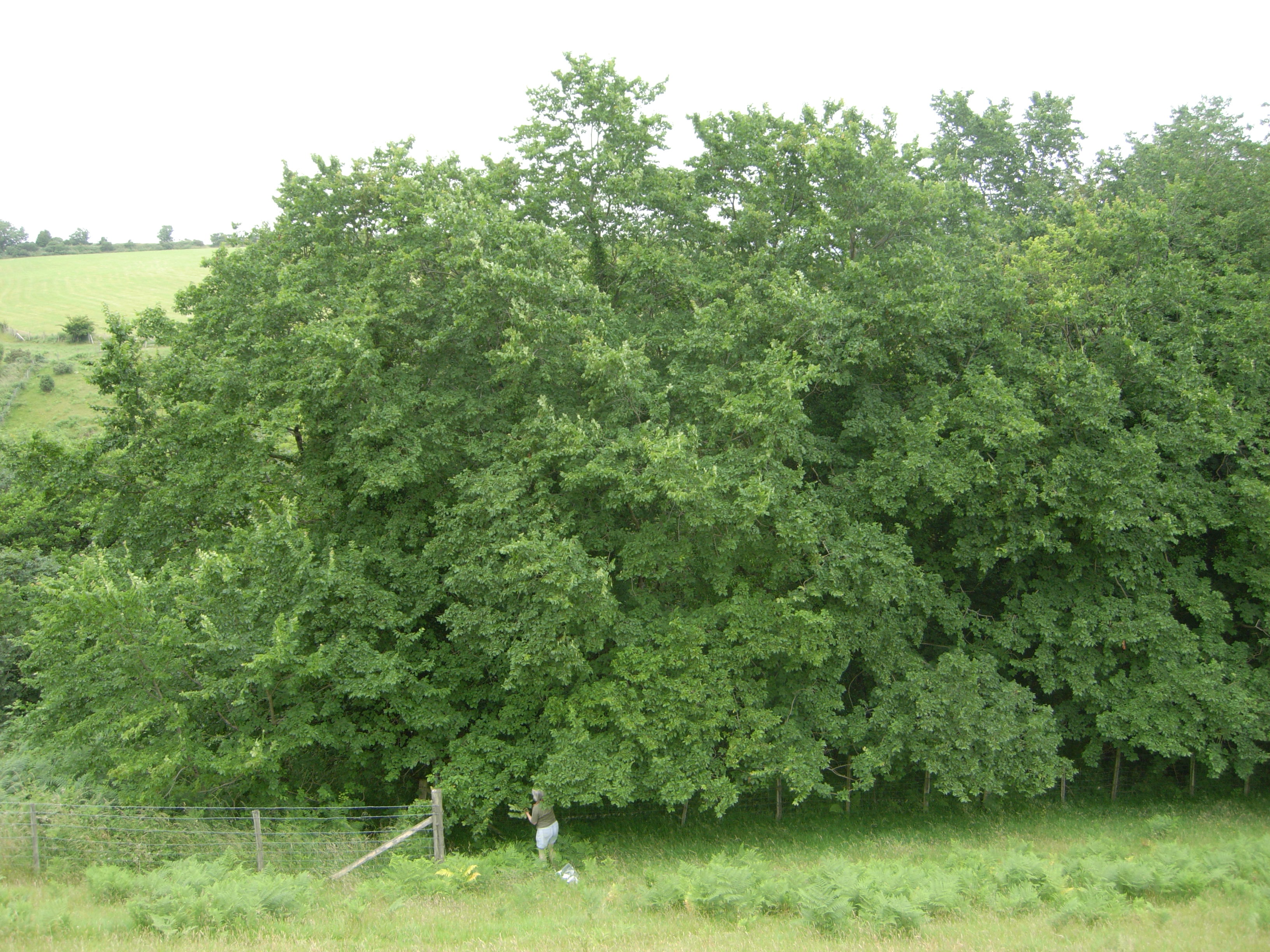
'Major', Isle of Man, May 2007

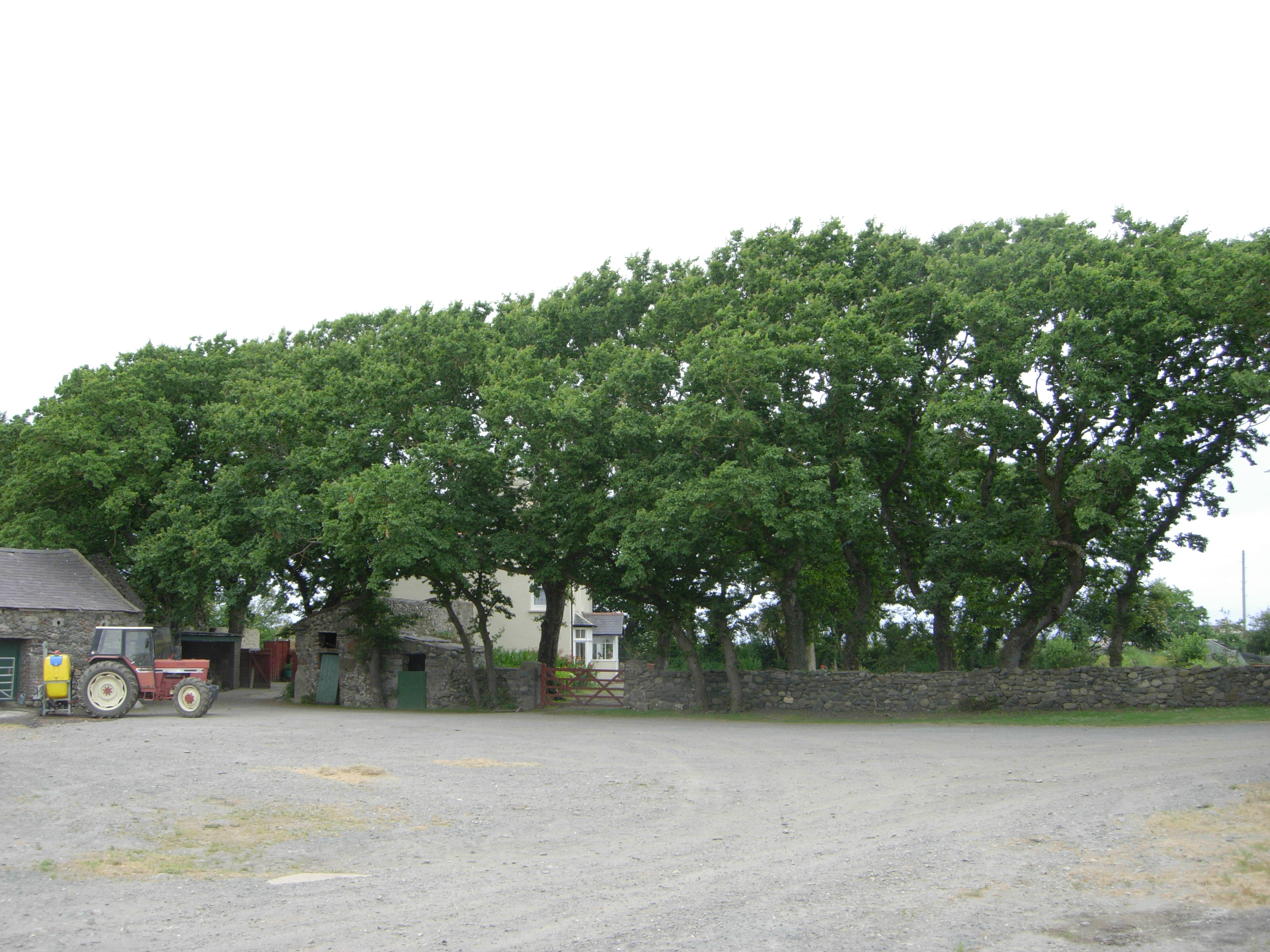
'Major' as a windbreak elm, Isle of Man

== Notable trees ==
Owing to Dutch elm disease, mature trees are rare in the UK, except in Brighton and Hove, East Sussex; The Level, in Brighton, alone has over 80 specimens in a double avenue. Other examples, including the TROBI Champion (27 m high by 139 cm d.b.h. in 2009, after pollarding) can be seen in the city along the London Road. The specimen at Leeds Castle was, at 38 m, the tallest elm surviving in Britain until it blew down in 2000.

There are also good examples in Edinburgh along Fettes Row, and one at the intersection of Royal Circus and Circus Place (bole-girth 2.5 m), while a single mature 'Major' survives at the extreme east end of East Princes Street Gardens (2025). A 2011 study by Dr Max Coleman of the Royal Botanic Garden, Edinburgh, has confirmed that many thousands of mature 'Major' survive in the Isle of Man.

Many old trees survive (2018) in New Zealand, notably in Auckland, the finest considered to be the specimen found outside the Ellerslie Racecourse.

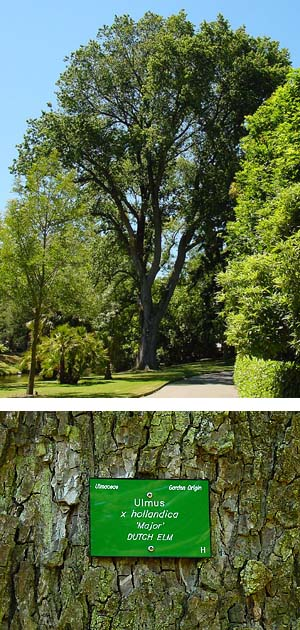
'Major', Botanical Gardens, Christchurch, NZ (2004)

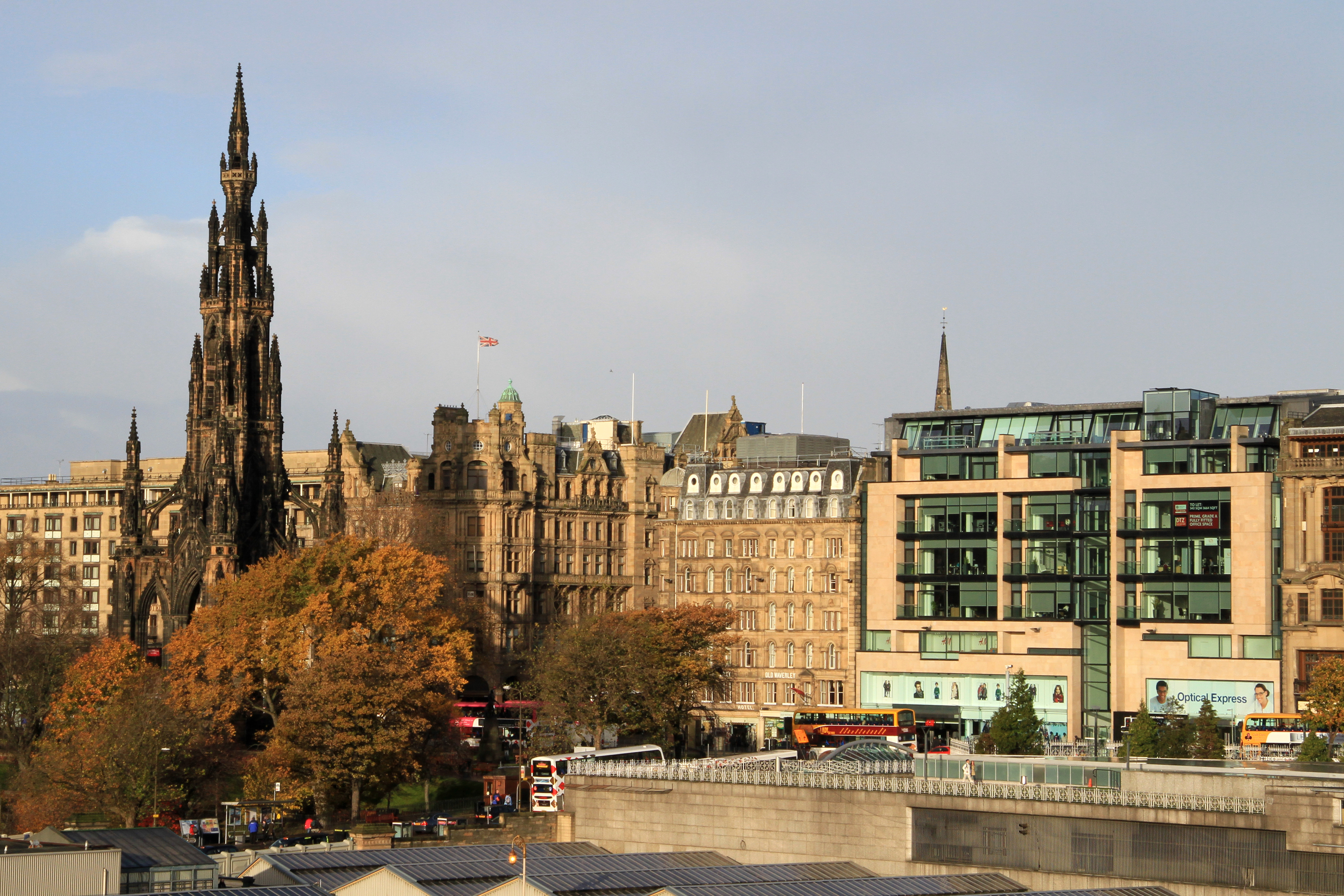
Old 'Major', tallest tree near Scott Monument, Edinburgh, showing autumn colour (2010)

== Synonymy ==
- Ulmus × hollandica 'Hollandica': Richens
- Ulmus montana (: glabra) var. gigantea Hort.: Kirchner , in Petzold & Kirchner, Arboretum Muscaviense 564, 1864
- ?Ulmus montana (: glabra) var. macrophylla fastigiata Hort.: Nicholson, Kew Hand-List Trees & Shrubs, 2: 141, 1896
- ?Ulmus × hollandica Ypreau: Richens

== In art ==
The open, irregular branching of 'Major' appears in Constable's Salisbury Cathedral from the bishop's grounds (1823), and in G. N. Wright's Wellington Monument, Phoenix Park (c.1830) (see 'Cultivation'). The elm grove in Kensington Gardens, London, said by Elwes to have been 'Major', was illustrated by numerous artists, but most effectively, in Richens' view, by Seymour Haden in his etching Kensington Gardens (1860). The more regular canopy sometimes found in 'Major' appears in a botanical drawing in Loudon's Arboretum et Fruticetum Britannicum (1854).

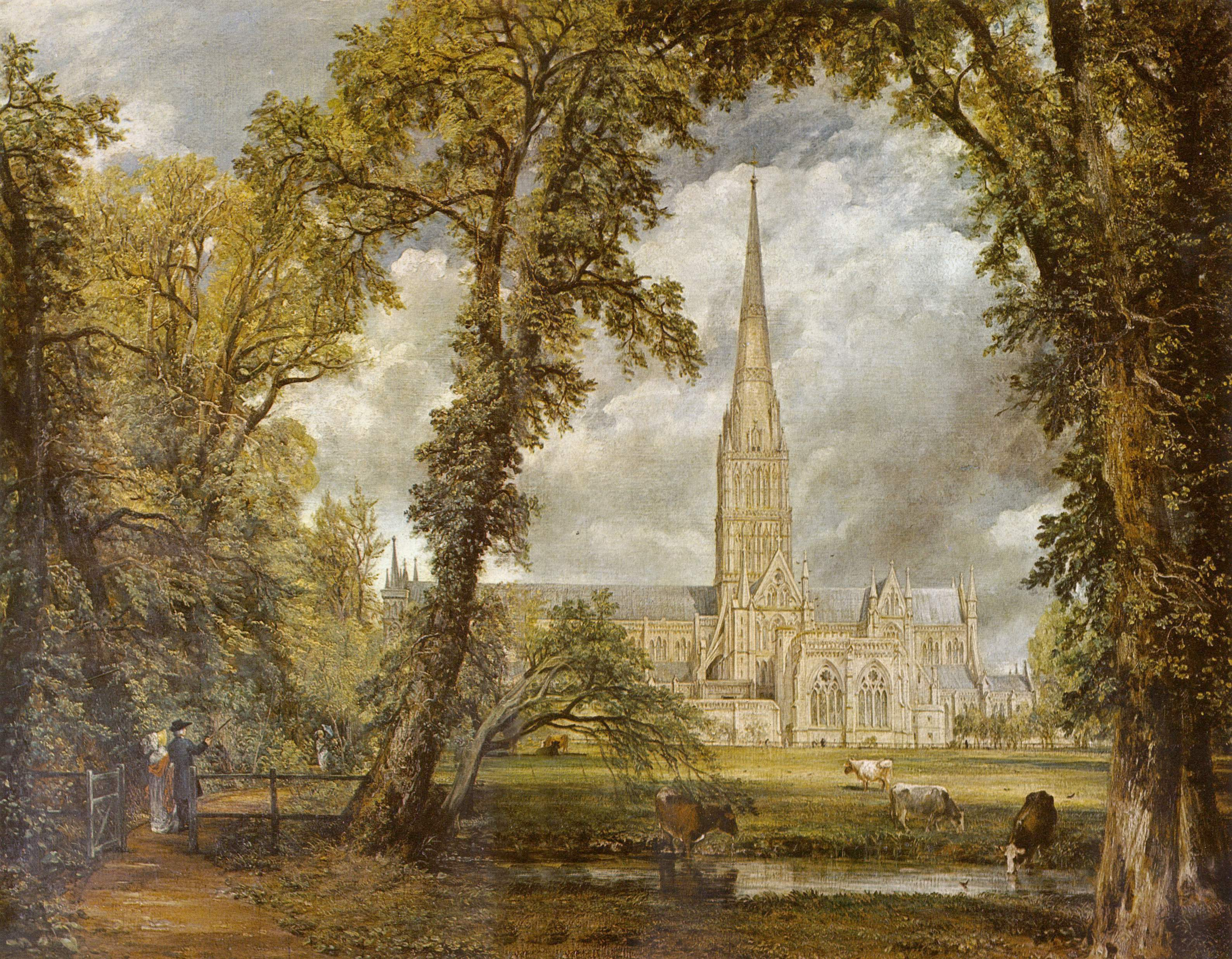
Dutch Elm, Salisbury Cathedral from the Bishop's grounds (1823)

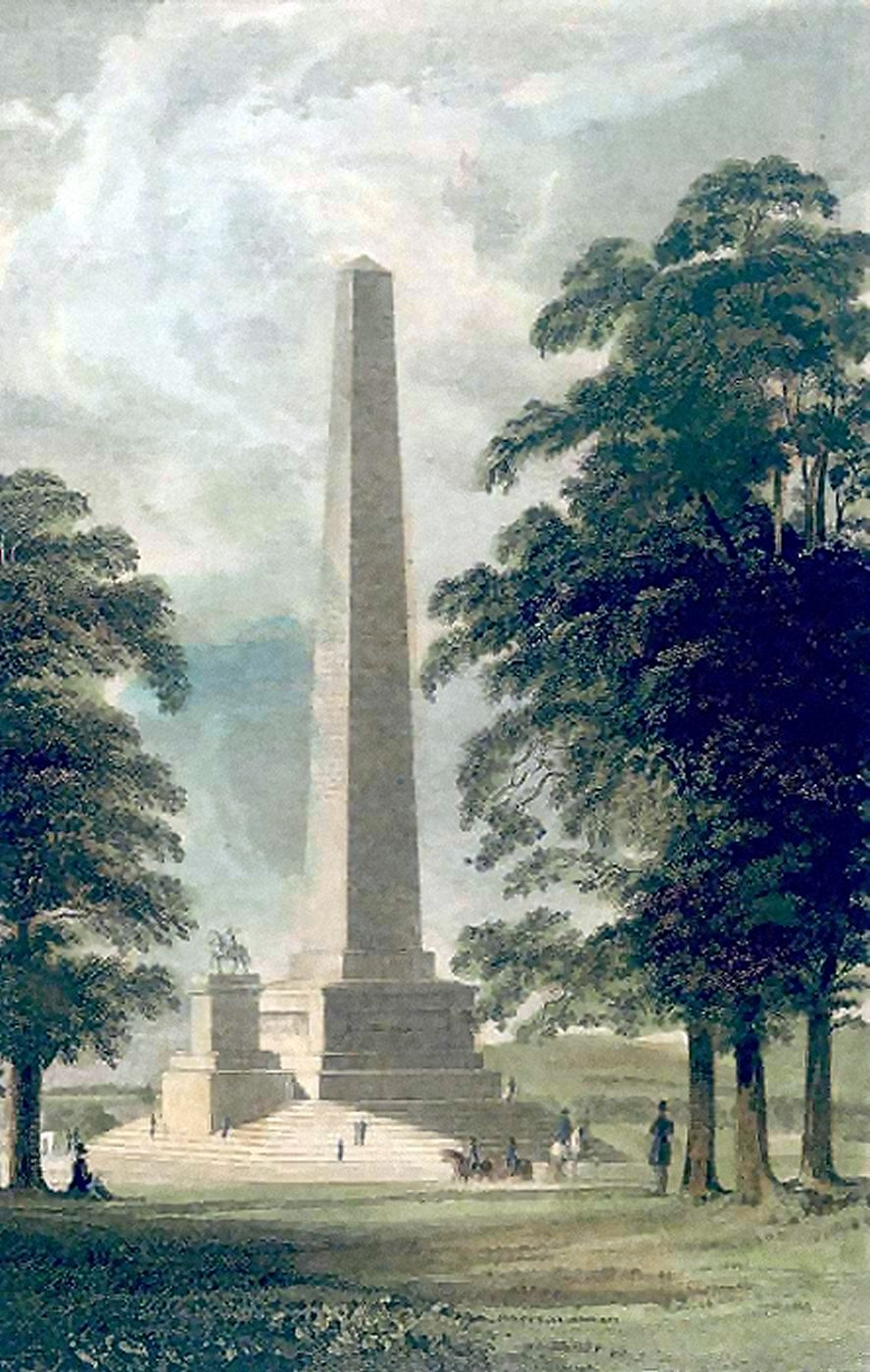
Dutch Elm by the Wellington Monument, Phoenix Park, Dublin, by G. N. Wright (c.1830)

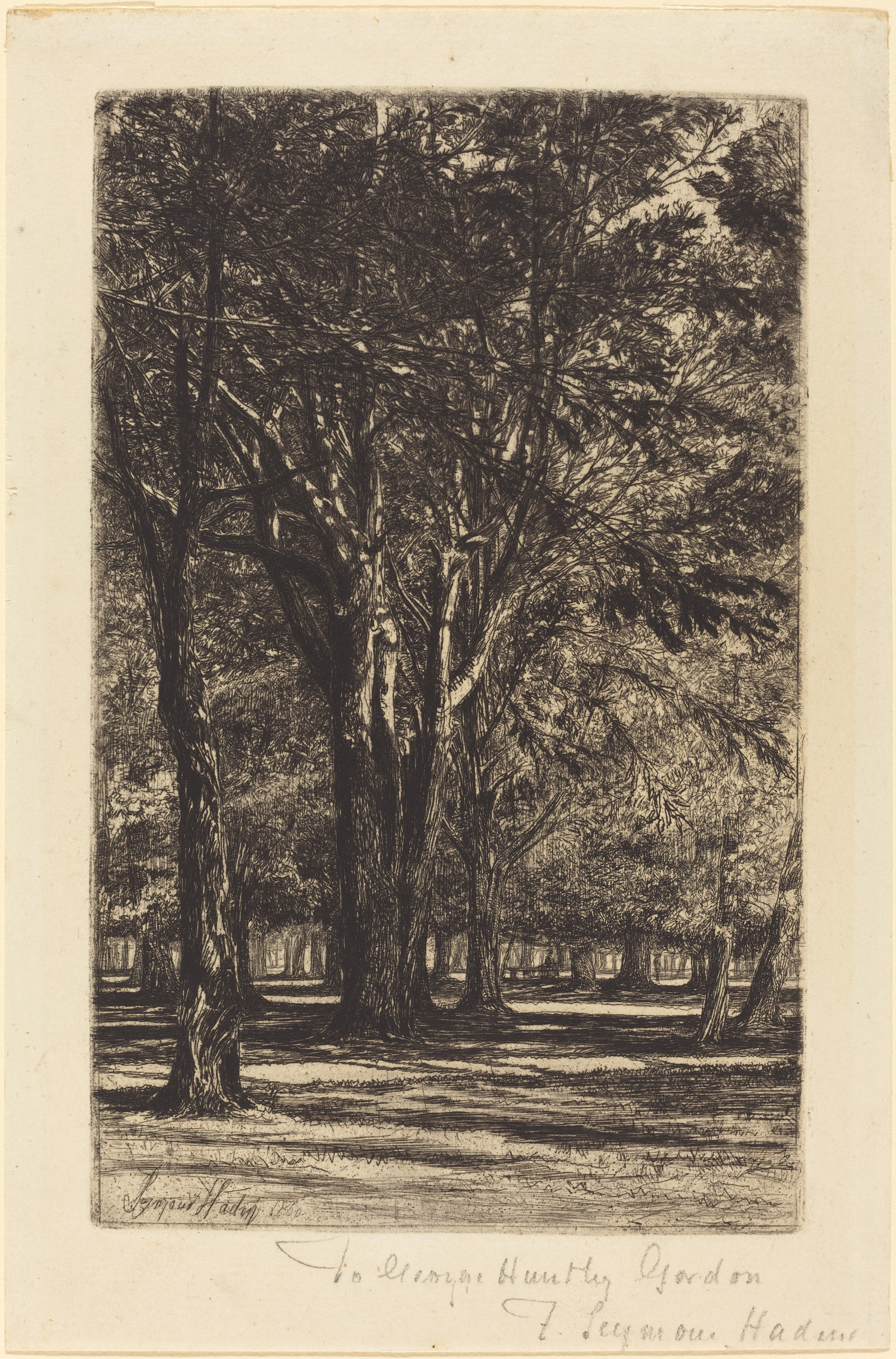
Dutch Elm grove, Kensington Gardens, etching by Seymour Haden (1860)

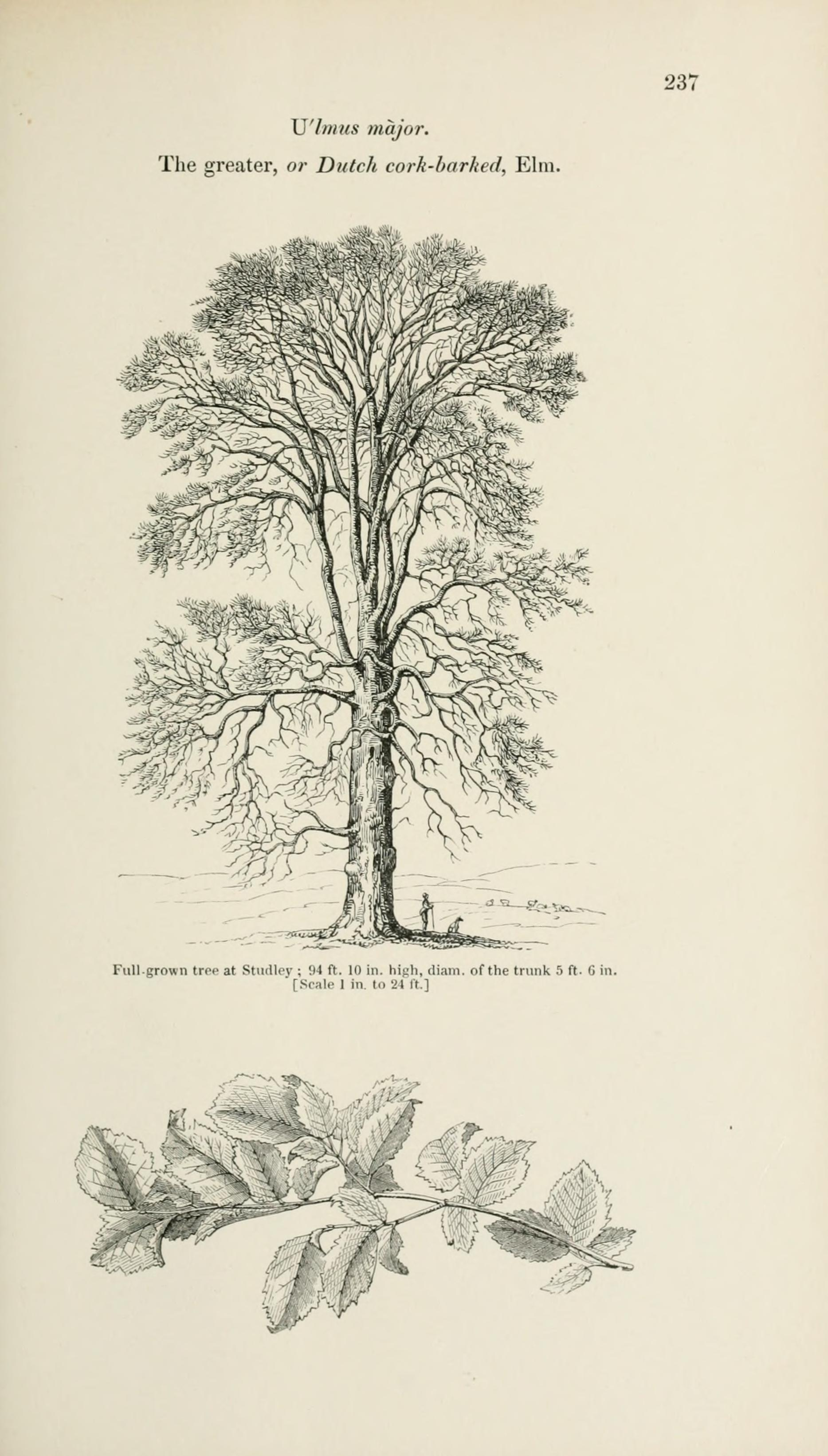
'Ulmus major, the greater or Dutch cork-barked elm', Arboretum et Fruticetum Britannicum (1854)

== Cultivars ==
- 'Eleganto-Variegata'

== Accessions ==
=== North America ===
- Arnold Arboretum, US. Acc. no. 241-98, from cultivated material.
- Longwood Gardens, US. Acc. no. L-0600, unrecorded provenance.
- Morton Arboretum, US. Acc. nos. 1114-25, 338-46.

=== Europe ===
- Brighton & Hove City Council, UK. NCCPG Elm Collection. Over 1000 specimens, inc. TROBI champion..
- Grange Farm Arboretum, Sutton St James, Spalding, Lincolnshire, UK. Acc. no. 1099.
- Royal Botanic Gardens Wakehurst Place, UK. Acc. no. 1973-20146.

=== Australasia ===
- Avenue of Honour, Ballarat, Australia. As 'Hollandica'.
- Avenue of Honour, Bacchus Marsh, Australia.
- Christchurch Botanic Gardens, Christchurch, New Zealand. Details not known.
- Eastwoodhill Arboretum , Gisborne, New Zealand. 10 trees, details not known.

== Nurseries ==
=== Australasia ===
- Established Tree Planters Pty. Ltd., Wandin, Victoria, Australia.
