= Dorothy Emmet =

British philosopher (1904–2000)

- Born: Dorothy Mary Emmet; 29 September 1904; Kensington, London, England
- Died: 20 September 2000 (aged 95); Cambridge, England

Education
- Education: Lady Margaret Hall, Oxford; Radcliffe College
- Doctoral advisor: Alfred North Whitehead

Philosophical work
- School: Process philosophy
- Institutions: Armstrong College, Newcastle; University of Manchester; Lucy Cavendish College, Cambridge
- Notable students: Alasdair MacIntyre
- Main interests: Metaphysics; Philosophy of religion Ethics
- Notable ideas: Social-role account of moral relations

Dorothy Mary Emmet (/ˈɛmɪt/; 29 September 1904 – 20 September 2000) was a British philosopher and head of Manchester University's philosophy department for over twenty years.

With Margaret Masterman and Richard Braithwaite she was a founder member of the Epiphany Philosophers. Her graduate students at Manchester included Alasdair MacIntyre and Robert Austin Markus. Emmet was educated at Lady Margaret Hall, Oxford, where she took first-class honours in 1927. She was elected to the membership of Manchester Literary and Philosophical Society in 1945 while living in Northenden, Manchester.

Throughout her twenty-year tenure of the Sir Samuel Hall chair of philosophy at Manchester she was the University's sole woman professor. In her time there she was at the heart of a interdisciplinary conversation with a set of social scientists and philosophers, who included Michael Polanyi, Max Gluckman, W. J. M. Mackenzie and Ely Devons.

== Positions held ==
- Commonwealth Fellowship at Radcliffe College
- Tutor at Somerville College, Oxford
- Lecturer in philosophy at Armstrong College, Newcastle-upon-Tyne (now Newcastle University) in 1932
- She joined Manchester University as a lecturer in the philosophy of religion in 1938. She was named reader in philosophy in 1945 and was appointed Sir Samuel Hall professor of philosophy in 1946.
- President of the Aristotelian Society in 1953–54.
- Fellow, Lucy Cavendish College, University of Cambridge in 1966

== Publications ==
- Whitehead's Philosophy of Organism (1932)
- The Nature of Metaphysical Thinking (1945)
- Annual philosophical lecture to the British Academy (1949)
- The Stanton lectures in Cambridge (1950–53)
- Function, Purpose and Powers (1958)
- Rules, Roles and Relations (1966)
- Sociological Theory and Philosophical Analysis (1970; co-edited with Alasdair MacIntyre).
- The Moral Prism (1979)
- The Effectiveness of Causes (1986)
- The Passage of Nature (1992)
- The Role of the Unrealisable (1994)
- Philosophers and Friends: Reminiscences of 70 Years in Philosophy (1996)

== Sources ==
- Obituary: Dorothy Emmet The Guardian, 27 September 2000
- Dorothy Emmet Times obituary, 8 October 2000 – archived by Wayback Machine
- James A. Bradley, André Cloots, Helmut Maaßen and Michel Weber (eds.), European Studies in Process Thought, Vol. I. In Memoriam Dorothy Emmet, Leuven, European Society for Process Thought, 2003 (ISBN 3-8330-0512-2).
- Leemon McHenry, "Dorothy M. Emmet (1904–2000)," in Michel Weber and Will Desmond (eds.). Handbook of Whiteheadian Process Thought (Frankfurt / Lancaster, Ontos Verlag, 2008, pp. 649 sq.). Cf. Ronny Desmet & Michel Weber (edited by), Whitehead. The Algebra of Metaphysics. Applied Process Metaphysics Summer Institute Memorandum, Louvain-la-Neuve, Les Éditions Chromatika, 2010.
- Leemon McHenry, "EMMET, Dorothy Mary (1904–2000)" Dictionary of Twentieth-Century British Philosophers, edited by Stuart Brown, Bristol: Thoemmes Press, 2005, pp. 266–268.
