= Walter Sibbald Adie =

Walter Sibbald Adie (17 August 1872 - 6 April 1956) was an accountant General in the Indian Civil Service from 1896 to 1929. After he retired from this position he taught Indian languages at Cambridge University.

Adie was born in Richmond, the son of Patrick Adie and Clementina Hellaby. He was the grandson of the Edinburgh medical imnstrument maker, Alexander Adie.

Adie attended Trinity College, Cambridge and was Senior Wrangler in 1894. He donated his stamp collection to be sold in support Trinity College Library. He also donated four manuscripts in Burmese and Sanskrit to the School of Oriental and African Studies library in 1943.

He turned a building in Millington Road into Adie's Museum, which housed a number of Asian sculptures. From 1955 he rented this out to the Cambridge Language Research Unit.
