= Ulmus × hollandica 'Eleganto-Variegata' =

Elm cultivar

- Hybrid parentage: U. glabra × U. minor
- Cultivar: 'Eleganto-Variegata'
- Origin: Europe

The hybrid elm cultivar Ulmus × hollandica 'Eleganto-Variegata' is one of a number of cultivars arising from the crossing of the Wych Elm U. glabra with a variety of Field Elm U. minor. It was first mentioned by Miller in The Gardeners Dictionary (1735), as U. major Hollandica, angustis & magis acuminatis sammaris, folio latissimo scabro, eleganter variegato.

== Description ==
The tree was described as the Dutch elm with striped leaves.

== Pests and diseases ==
'Major' (if 'Eleganto-Variegata' is a sport of this) is very susceptible to Dutch elm disease.

== Cultivation ==
A "striped-leaved Dutch elm" was distributed by Perfect's of Pontefract, Yorkshire, in the 1770s. No specimens are known to survive.
