= Cambridge Language Research Unit =

English research unit

The Cambridge Language Research Unit (CLRU) was founded by Margaret Masterman in 1954 to bring together researchers from different academic backgrounds to study the possibility of machine translation.

The Massachusetts Institute of Technology publication Machine Translation published a special issue in 1956 dedicated to the CLRU noting that mechanical translation was, at that time an area of study unexplored within the official curriculum of any English university. Based in Millington Road, Cambridge the unit picked up on the conjectural role of an intermediate language with antecedents in the seventeenth century work of John Wilkins and George Dalgarno.

== Origins ==
Masterman (also known as Mrs Braithwaite) met Richard Hook Richens in 1948. Richens was a botanist specializing in research on elms. In 1946 he published The New Genetics in the Soviet Union, written with Penrhyn Stanley Hudson, of the in 1946. In this booklet he discusses Dialectical Materialism, using Lenin's Materialism and Empirio-criticism to criticize the methodology used in Soviet scientific publications. He was also developing an interest in machine translation. He was approaching the problem from a mechanical perspective. While he had developed a kind of "Mechanical pidgin" he was on the verge of giving up. But then he met Masterman, a former pupil of Ludwig Wittgenstein, (she had taken the notes from some of his lectures for subsequent publication) whose approach was rooted in language. They realized that together they had some prospect of addressing the problems each had encountered. They were able to raise £250 form six supporters which they invested in "Adie's Museum", a somewhat ramshackle building in Millington Road (since demolished) owned by Walter Sibbald Adie.
