= Samuel Edgar =

Irish cricketer

Personal information
- Full name: Samuel James Edgar
- Born: 29 September 1913; Lisburn, Ireland
- Died: 31 January 1937 (aged 23); Lisburn, Northern Ireland
- Batting: Right-handed
- Bowling: Right-arm medium

Domestic team information
- Years: Team
- 1934: Ireland

Career statistics
| Competition | First-class |
|---|---|
| Matches | 1 |
| Runs scored | 32 |
| Batting average | 32.00 |
| 100s/50s | –/– |
| Top score | 32 |
| Catches/stumpings | –/– |
- Source: Cricinfo, 3 January 2022

Samuel James Edgar (born 23 September 1913 in Lisburn, County Antrim; died 31 January 1937 in Lisburn) was an Irish cricketer.

A right-handed batsman and a right-arm medium pace bowler, he played twice for the Ireland cricket team against the MCC in 1934. He made his debut in a two-day match in Strabane in July, scoring 103 opening the batting in the first innings. His second, and final, match was a first-class match at Trinity College in Dublin the following month.
