= Clive W. Kilmister =

British mathematician

Clive William Kilmister
- Born: 3 January 1924; Epping, Essex, England
- Died: 2 May 2010 (aged 86); Lewes, East Sussex, England
- Education: Queen Mary College
- Known for: Mathematical foundations of physics General relativity Quantum mechanics
- Scientific career
- Fields: Mathematics; Mathematical physics
- Workplaces: King's College London
- Doctoral advisor: George C. McVittie
- Doctoral students: Brian Tupper; Samuel Edgar; Tony Crilly

Clive William Kilmister (3 January 1924 – 2 May 2010) was a British mathematician who specialised in the mathematical foundations of physics, especially quantum mechanics and relativity.

Kilmister attended Queen Mary College London for both his under - and postgraduate degrees. Whilst an undergraduate he was friends with Frank W. J. Olver. In a 1988 Gresham Coillege lecture, he recounted how the two of them would shout requests to formulas to one another in order to prepare for their final exams. Kilmister regarded Olver as a better mathematician than himself, but suggests that had Olver not caught a bout of flu, then Olver would surely of one the schjolarship which launched Kilmister's subsequent career. His 1950 PhD on The Use of Quaternions in Wave-Tensor Calculus related to Arthur Eddington's work, and was supervised by cosmologist George C. McVittie, who was one of Eddington's students. His own students included Brian Tupper (1959, King's College London, now professor emeritus of general relativity and cosmology at University of New Brunswick Fredericton ), Samuel Edgar (1977, University of London), and Tony Crilly (reader in mathematical sciences at Middlesex University).

Kilmister was elected as a member of the London Mathematical Society during his doctoral studies (17 March 1949). Upon graduation, he began his career as an Assistant Lecturer in the Mathematics Department of King's College in 1950. The entirety of his academic career was spent at King's. In 1954, Kilmister founded the King's Gravitational Theory Group, in concert with Hermann Bondi and Felix Pirani, which focused on Einstein's theory of general relativity. At retirement, Kilmister was both a Professor of Mathematics and Head of the King's College Mathematics Department.

== Honors, positions, and titles ==
- Member, London Mathematical Society, 1949–2010
- President, British Society for the History of Mathematics, 1974–76
- President, British Society for the Philosophy of Science, 1981–82
- President, Mathematical Association, 1979–1980
- Gresham Professor of Geometry, 1972–1988
- Committee Member, International Society on General Relativity and Gravitation, 1971–1974
- Founding Member, Alternative Natural Philosophy Association

== Publications (arranged by year of publication) ==
- "Eddington's Statistical Theory (Oxford Mathematical Monographs) " (1962)
- "Hamiltonian Dynamics" (1964)
- "The Environment in Modern Physics: A Study in Relativistic Mechanics" (1965)
- "Men of Physics: Sir Arthur Eddington" (1966)
- "Rational Mechanics" (1966)
- Language, Logic, and Mathematics (1967)
- Exploring University Mathematics 2: Lectures Given at Bedford College. (1968)
- Nature of the Universe (World of Science) (October 18, 1971)
- General Theory of Relativity (Selected Readings in Physics) (November 1973)
- Relativistic Mechanics, Time and Inertia (Fundamental Theories of Physics) (31 December 1984)
- Disequilibrium and Self-Organisation (1 July 1986)
- "Russell (Philosophers in Context" (21 August 1986)
- Radiation from Relativistic Electrons (American Institute of Physics Translation Series) (October 1986)
- Special Relativity for Physicists (December 1987)
- Schrödinger: Centenary Celebration of a Polymath (31 March 1989)
- Combinatorial Physics (October 1995)
- Lagrangian Dynamics: An Introduction for Students (31 December 1995)
- "Special Theory of Relativity" (January 2000)
- Eddington's Search for a Fundamental Theory: A Key to the Universe (7 July 2005)
- The Origin of Discrete Particles (Series on Knots and Everything) (7 August 2009)
