= Margaret Masterman =

British linguist and philosopher (1910–1986)

- Born: Margaret Mary Masterman; 4 May 1910; St George Hanover Square, London
- Died: 1 April 1986 (aged 75); Cambridge, England
- Education: Newnham College, Cambridge
- Spouse: R. B. Braithwaite (m. 1932)
- Children: 2
- Parents: Charles Masterman (father); Lucy Masterman (mother)
- Relatives: Neville Lyttelton (grandfather); Arthur Masterman (uncle); Howard Masterman (uncle)
- Family: Lyttelton family
- Scientific career
- Fields: Computational linguistics
- Workplaces: Cambridge Language Research Unit; Lucy Cavendish College, Cambridge

Margaret Mary Masterman (married name Braithwaite; 4 May 1910 – 1 April 1986) was a British linguist and philosopher, most known for her pioneering work in the field of computational linguistics and especially machine translation. She founded the Cambridge Language Research Unit.

== Early life and education ==
Masterman was born on 4 May 1901 in St George Hanover Square, London. Her father, Charles Masterman, was a Liberal Party politician and writer, and her mother, Lucy Masterman, was poet, writer and member of the Lyttelton family. The maternal granddaughter of the army officer Neville Lyttelton, through her father she was the niece of Arthur Masterman, a zoologist, and Howard Masterman, the Anglican Bishop of Plymouth. One of three siblings, Masterman was sister of the historian and translator Neville Charles Masterman (1912–2019).

Educated at Hamilton House in Royal Tunbridge Wells and the Institut Brittany in Paris, Masterman later studied modern and medieval languages and moral science at Newnham College, Cambridge. Working for a period in the theatre and as a writer, Masterman returned to Cambridge where she studied philosophy under her future husband R. B. Braithwaite. Masterman was one of six students to attend the 1933 and 1934 lectures of Ludwig Wittgenstein, and her lecture notes were later used for the The Blue Book. Notes taken by Masterman and Alice Ambrose during the intervals between the dictation of The Blue Book were later compiled into The Yellow Book.

== Career ==
In 1955, she founded and directed the Cambridge Language Research Unit (CLRU), which grew from an informal discussion group to a major research centre in computational linguistics in its time. The Cambridge Language Research Unit was founded in a small but beautiful building called Adie's Museum which had housed far eastern art: small Buddhist sculptures were built into its walls and carved doors. For a period of twenty years starting in 1953 it was a source of significant research in machine translation, computational linguistics, and quantum physics even though outside the official university structures in Cambridge. It was funded by grants from US agencies (AFOSR, ONR, NSF), UK Government agencies (OSTI) and later, from EU funds in Luxembourg. Its computing facilities were primitive—an ancient ICL 1202 computer—and most of its more serious computation was done either on the Cambridge university machine, in the then Mathematical Laboratory—or by CLRU visitors at sites in the US. One measure of its impact, and from a staff that never exceeded ten people, was that of the Annual Lifetime Achievement Awards from the Association for Computational Linguistics in the US. Three have been awarded to CLRU alumni: Martin Kay, Karen Spärck Jones and Yorick Wilks.

Margaret Masterman was ahead of her time by some twenty years: many of her beliefs and proposals for language processing by computer have now become part of the common stock of ideas in the artificial intelligence (AI) and machine translation (MT) fields. She was never able to lay adequate claim to them because they were unacceptable when she published them, and so when they were written up later by her students or independently "discovered" by others, there was no trace back to her, especially in these fields where little to nothing over ten years old is ever reread.

The core of her beliefs about language processing was that it must reflect the coherence of language, its redundancy as a signal. This idea was a partial inheritance from the old "information-theoretic" view of language: for her, it meant that processes analysing language must take into account its repetitive and redundant structures and that a writer goes on saying the same thing again and again in different ways; only if the writer does that can the ambiguities be removed from the signal. This sometimes led her to overemphasise the real and explicit redundancy she would find in rhythmical and repetitive verse and claim, implausibly, that normal English was just like that, if only we could see it right.

This led, in later years, to the key role she assigned to rhythm, stress, breathgroupings and the boundaries they impose on text and the processes of understanding. To put it crudely, her claim was that languages are the way they are, at least in part, because they are produced by creatures that breathe at fairly regular intervals. It will be obvious why such claims could not even be entertained while Chomsky's views were preeminent in language studies. However she could never give systematic surface criteria by which the breathgroups and stress patterns were to be identified by surface cues, or could be reduced to other criteria such as syntax or morphology, nor would she become involved in the actual physics of voice patterns.

Her views on the importance of semantics in language processing (which, she continued to defend in the high years of Chomskyan syntax between 1951 and 1966) were much influenced by R. H. Richens' views on classification and description by means of a language of semantic primitives with its own syntax. These, along with associated claims about semantic pattern matching onto surface text, were developed in actual programs, from which it might be assumed that she was a straightforward believer in the existence of semantic primitives in some Katzian or Schankian sense. Nothing could be further from the truth: for she was far too much a Wittgensteinian sceptic about the ability of any limited sublanguage or logic to take on the role of the whole language. She always argued that semantic primitives would only make sense if there were empirical criteria for their discovery and a theory that allowed for the fact that they, too, would develop exactly the polysemy of any higher or natural language; and she always emphasised the functional role of primitives in, for example, resolving sense ambiguity and as an interlingua for MT.

She hoped that the escape from the problem of the origin of semantic primitives would lie in either empirical classification procedures operating on actual texts (in the way some now speak of deriving primitives by massive connectionist learning), or by having an adequate formal theory of the structure of thesauri, which she believed to make explicit certain underlying structures of the semantic relations in a natural language: a theory such that "primitives" would emerge naturally as the organizing classification of thesauri. For some years, she and colleagues explored lattice theory as the underlying formal structure of such thesauri.

Two other concerns that went through her intellectual life owe much to the period when Michael Halliday, as the University Lecturer in Chinese at Cambridge, was a colleague at CLRU. She got from him the idea that syntactic theory was fundamentally semantic or pragmatic, in either its categories and their fundamental definition, or in terms of the role of syntax as an organizing principle for semantic information. She was the first AI researcher to be influenced by Halliday, long before Terry Winograd. Again, she became preoccupied for a considerable period with the nature and function of Chinese ideograms, because she felt they clarified in an empirical way problems that Wittgenstein had wrestled with in his so-called picture-theory-of-truth. This led her to exaggerate the generality of ideogrammatic principles and to seem to hold that English was really rather like Chinese if only seen correctly, with its meaning atoms, highly ambiguous and virtually uninflected. It was a view that found little or no sympathy in the dominant linguistic or computational currents of the time.

Her main creation in 1953, one which endured for twenty years, was the Cambridge Language Research Unit. It grew out of an informal discussion group with a very heterogeneous membership interested in language from philosophical and computational points of view. Subsequently, the attempt to build language processing programs with a philosophical basis was a distinctive feature of the Unit's work. This approach to language processing, and the specific form it took in the use of a thesaurus as the main vehicle for semantic operations, will probably come to be seen as the Unit's major contributions to the field as a whole, and it was Margaret who was primarily responsible for them. Much of the C.L.R.U.'s work had to be done on the predecessors of computers, namely Hollerith punched card machines. The Unit could continue for decades, even through periods when public support for such work was hard to come by. It is difficult now, in these days of artificial intelligence in the ordinary market place, and powerful personal computers, to realize how hard it was to get the financial resources needed for language-processing research, and the technical resources to do experiments.

Perhaps the best comment on Margaret's initiative in embarking on language processing research, and specifically on machine translation work, comes from a somewhat unexpected source. Machine translation, after an initial period of high hopes, and some large claims, was cast into outer darkness in 1966 by funding agencies who saw little return for their money. Reviewing twenty five years of artificial intelligence research in his presidential address to the American Association for Artificial Intelligence in 1985, Woody Bledsoe, one of the long-standing leaders of the field, though in areas quite outside language, said of those who attempted machine translation in the fifties and sixties: "They may have failed, but they were right to try; we have learned so much from their attempts to do something so difficult".

What she and CLRU were attempting was relatively distinct from the approaches of its contemporaries. Efforts were made to tackle fundamental problems with the computers of the day that had the capacity of a modern digital wristwatch. Despite problems of every kind, the Unit produced numerous publications on language and related subjects, including information retrieval and automatic classification. The Unit contributed to the field for over ten years, always with an emphasis on the basic semantic problems of language understanding. Margaret's approach differed from those which emphasize syntactic parsing or complete parsing prior to further processing. The ideas of CLRU can now be seen to align with modern approaches, wherein the semantics of language are regarded as a basic part of its understanding by machine.

Margaret's main contribution to the life of CLRU was in the continual intellectual stimulus she gave to its research, and through this to the larger natural language processing community: she had wide-ranging concerns, and lateral ideas, which led her, for example, to propose the thesaurus as a means of carrying out many distinct language processing tasks, like indexing and translation. Margaret's emphasis on algorithms, and on testing them, was vital for the development of CLRU's work on language processing; but her ideas were notable, especially for those who worked with her, not just for their Intellectual qualities, but for their sheer joyousness.

Serious research stopped at CLRU about 1978 and Margaret tried to restart the CLRU in 1980 with William Williams in the hope that the new breed of micro-computers could be used to develop her algorithms for natural language translation. Margaret walked the 7 miles from Millington Road in Cambridge to Orwell and purchased two North Star Horizon computers from Intelligent Artefacts (see ST Robotics). These were installed with the Forth programming language, written by David Sands and used by various students from the University of Cambridge who programmed Margaret's algorithms into the computers. Margaret's approach to natural language translation at this time was to split a sentence into "breath group" segments. Since each breath group had a unique meaning it could be translated into the target language and the target sentence reconstructed using the translated breath groups. This contrasted with the predominant language translation techniques of the time, notably Systran which used a dictionary and rule based system still used today. When Margaret died in 1986 William Williams closed down CLRU and its unique library of early MT documents were dumped into a skip, even though two university bodies had offered to give it a home.

She was one of cofounders of Lucy Cavendish College and its first Vice-President (1965–1975). She was a great-niece of Lucy Cavendish after whom the college is named. She also was a founder and the major inspiration of the Epiphany Philosophers, a group which shared some membership with the CLRU and was dedicated to the study of the relationship of science and religion and the forms of religious practice.

In 1965, Margaret Masterman read the work "The Nature of a Paradigm" at the Fourth International Colloquium in the Philosophy of Science, in London. She conducted a detailed textual criticism of Thomas S. Kuhn's book, The Structure of Scientific Revolutions (1962), characterizing the book as "at once scientifically perspicuous and philosophically obscure." Masterman praised Kuhn as "one of the outstanding philosophers of science of our time" and his concept of paradigms as "a fundamental idea and a new one in the philosophy of science." She criticised Thomas Kuhn for his vague and inconsistent use of the concept "Paradigm," noting that it is used in at least 21 different senses, which can be summarized in three groups: metaparadigms, sociological paradigms, and artefact or construct paradigms. Masterman proposed that Kuhn's critics in the philosophy of science dealt only with metaparadigms and explored the insights and implications of the various conceptions. This criticism was accepted by Thomas Kuhn and was crucial in the shift of the concept "Paradigm" to "Incommensurability".

== Personal life ==
On 18 October 1932, Masterman married the philosopher R. B. Braithwaite with whom she had two children. Masterman died in Cambridge on 1 April 1986, aged 75.

== Selected publications ==
- 1959: What is a thesaurus?
