= Richard Hook Richens =

Botanist and computational linguist (1919–1984)

Richard Hook Richens (1919–1984) was a botanist and an early researcher in Computational Linguistics.

== Botany ==
R. H. Richens was the Director of the Commonwealth Bureau of Plant Breeding and Genetics (part of the Commonwealth Agricultural Bureaux) at Cambridge University, and became best known for his studies of elm (Ulmus). His most famous publication was the seminal Elm, published in 1983, in which he sank many elms formerly treated as species as mere varieties or subspecies of Ulmus minor, notably the English elm U. procera, which he renamed U. minor var. vulgaris. Richens' all-England collection of specimen elm leaves, along with comparative samples from the Continent, assembled at the Cambridge Department of Applied Biology, is now held at the Cambridge University Herbarium in the Sainsbury Laboratory. Dr. Richens served for many years on the International Commission for the Nomenclature of Cultivated Plants, where he enjoyed challenging the vested interests of French rose growers who wanted to name new rose varieties after film stars etc. At the time when Britain joined the Common Market, he was involved in meetings to thrash out the details of the modifications required to the Common Agricultural Policy.

== Wartime activities ==
R. H. Richens was an undergraduate at Selwyn College, Cambridge at the start of World War II. He had always had an interest in church music and sang in Kings’ College Choir for a year. In 1940, along with his future wife Ruth, he formally joined the Roman Catholic Church. When he was called up after graduating, Richens became a conscientious objector, assigned, along with fellow biologists V. J. Chapman, R. A. Lewin and G. E. Fogg to a survey of the seaweeds on Britain’s coats, with a view to their possible use for making parachutes or feeding the nation. The work was dangerous as they had to take a small boat to navigate waters which were mined. His humorous account of their adventures was published posthumously as Strictly Marginal.

== Impact of DNA fingerprinting ==
Richens' approach has been much criticized since his death, and some of his taxonomy challenged or discarded. Dr Max Coleman of the Royal Botanic Garden, Edinburgh writes, however (2009): "The advent of DNA fingerprinting has shed considerable light on the question. A number of studies have now shown that the distinctive forms that Melville elevated to species and Richens lumped together as field elm are single clones, all genetically identical, that have been propagated by vegetative means such as cuttings or root suckers. This means that enigmatic British elms such as Plot Elm and English Elm have turned out to be single clones of field elm. Although Richens did not have the evidence to prove it, he got the story right by recognising a series of clones and grouping them together as a variable species."

== Early worker in computational linguistics ==
Although a professional botanist, Richens also had a personal interest in machine translation, carrying out important early work on the subject in collaboration with Margaret Masterman and Michael Halliday, and later at the Cambridge Language Research Unit. He invented the first semantic network for computers in 1956 as an "interlingua" for machine translation of natural languages.

== Church music ==
After the war R. H. Richens lived in Cambridge for the rest of his life. He was an accomplished pianist and organist and was choirmaster first at the Cambridge University Catholic chaplaincy at Fisher House and from 1961 at Our Lady and the English Martyrs Parish Church. As choirmaster, he would search the University Library for obscure Catholic church music, which he would transcribe or re-arrange for his choir. After the introduction of the vernacular Catholic liturgy following the Second Vatican Council, Dr. Richens perceived a threat to the survival of Latin music in the church. He joined the Latin Mass Society, of which he became a committee member.

In 1970 the Vatican introduced a new rite, the Ordo Missae aka Mass of Paul VI, which substantially changed the Catholic liturgy, irrespective of language. There was a split in the Latin Mass Society between those who wished to preserve the Tridentine Mass, which had endured with little change since 1570, and those, like Dr. Richens, who accepted the Ordo Missae and wished to preserve the use of Latin within it. The committee held a poll which was won decisively by the Tridentinists, whereupon, Dr. Richens resigned from the committee and from the society and founded the Association for Latin Liturgy to promote the use of Latin within the new rite. He wrote frequently to the Catholic press, lobbied bishops and worked tirelessly for this cause.

== Publications ==
- (1946). The New Genetics of the Soviet Union. (co-author with P. S. Hudson).
- (1955). Studies on Ulmus 1. The range of variation of East Anglian elms. Watsonia 3: 138–153.
- (1956). Elms. New Biology 20: 7–29.
- (1958). Studies on Ulmus II. The village elms of southern Cambridgeshire. Forestry 31: 132–146.
- (1959). Studies on Ulmus III. The village elms of Hertfordshire. Forestry 32: 138–154.
- (1960). Cambridgeshire elms. Nature in Cambridgeshire 3: 18–22.
- (1961)a. Studies on Ulmus IV. The village elms of Huntingdonshire and a new method for exploring taxonomic discontinuity. Forestry 34: 47–64.
- (1961)b. Studies on Ulmus V. The village elms of Bedfordshire. Forestry 34: 185–206.
- (1965). Studies on Ulmus VI. Fenland elms. Forestry 38: 225–235.
- (1967). Studies on Ulmus VII. Essex elms. Forestry 40: 185–206.
- (1968). The correct designation of the European Field Elm. Feddes Repertorium Speciorum Novarum Regni Vegetabilis 79: 1–2.
- (1976). Variation, cytogenics and breeding of the European Field Elms. Annales Forestales Analiza Sumartsvo (Zagreb) 7: 107–141.
- (1977). New designations in Ulmus minor Mill. Taxon 26: 583–584.
- (1978). Multivariate analysis of the elms of northern France and England: pooled analysis of the elm populations of northern France and England. Silvae Genetica 27: 85–95. (co-author Jeffers, J.N.R.).
- (1980). On fine distinctions in Ulmus L. Taxon 29: 305–312.
- (1981). Elms (Genus Ulmus). In: Hora, B. (ed.) The Oxford Encyclopaedia of Trees of the World. Oxford: OUP, 150–152.
- (1983). Elm. Cambridge University Press. ISBN 0521249163
- (1984). Ulmus × hollandica Miller var. insularum Richens var. nov. Watsonia 15: 105–108.
- (1985). The elms of Wales. Forestry 58: 9–25.
- (1995) Strictly Marginal. (co-author with Fogg, G. E. (illustrator) and Lewin, R. A.). British Phycological Society.
