= R. B. Braithwaite =

English philosopher and ethicist (1900–1990)

R. B. Braithwaite FBA
- Born: Richard Bevan Braithwaite; 15 January 1900; Banbury, Oxfordshire, England
- Died: 21 April 1990 (aged 90); Bottisham, Cambridgeshire, England
- Resting place: King's College Chapel, Cambridge
- Spouses: Dorothea Cotter (m. 1925; died 1928); Margaret Masterman (m. 1932; died 1986)
- Children: 2
- Relatives: Theodore Morison (father-in-law); Charles Masterman (father-in-law); Lucy Masterman (mother-in-law)

Education
- Education: King's College, Cambridge
- Academic advisor: G. E. Moore

Philosophical work
- Era: Contemporary philosophy
- Region: Western philosophy
- School: Analytic philosophy
- Institutions: University of Cambridge
- Doctoral students: Stephan Körner; Imre Lakatos
- Notable students: G. H. von Wright
- Main interests: Philosophy of science, ethics, philosophy of religion
- Notable ideas: The existence of logical features common to all the sciences The nature of religious belief Half-belief

Richard Bevan Braithwaite (/ˈbreɪθweɪt/; 15 January 1900 – 21 April 1990) was an English philosopher who specialized in the philosophy of science, ethics, and the philosophy of religion.

== Early life and education ==
Braithwaite was born on 15 January 1900 in Banbury, Oxfordshire to William Charles Braithwaite, a barrister, banker and historian of Quakerism, and Janet Braithwaite (née Morland). The eldest of four siblings, Braithwaite was the brother of the social scientist Constance Braithwaite (1904–1985).

Educated at Sidcot School from 1911 to 1914, Braithwaite attended Bootham School until 1918. A conscientious objector during the First World War, he served in the Friends' Ambulance Unit. Enrolling at King's College, Cambridge in 1919, he was elected to the Cambridge Apostles on 26 February 1921. Braithwaite became a wrangler in part II of the Mathematical Tripos in 1922, and the following year gained a first class in part II in the Moral Sciences Tripos. Braithwaite later gained his MA in 1926.

== Career ==
He was a Fellow of King's College, Cambridge from 1924 to 1990. He was appointed Cambridge University Lecturer in Moral Sciences in 1928.

He was a lecturer in moral science at the University of Cambridge from 1934 to 1953, then Knightbridge Professor of Moral Philosophy there from 1953 to 1967. He was president of the Aristotelian Society from 1946 to 1947, and was elected a Fellow of the British Academy in 1957.

=== Work ===
Although he was positivistically inclined, Braithwaite was a Christian, having been brought up a Quaker and becoming an Anglican later. According to theologian Alister McGrath, Braithwaite's 1955 Eddington Memorial Lecture "An Empiricist's View of the Nature of Religious Belief" is to date the most widely cited publication (e.g. by Anglican priest Don Cupitt) in a genre of 1970s–1980s theological works arguing that "God" and "religion" are human constructs—having no independent reality of their own—and that human dignity and freedom may best be advanced by systematic deconstruction of these two ideas, although Braithwaite himself had little sympathy for vague claims like these.

Braithwaite believed that religious utterances had to do with emotions and were therefore not descriptions in the sense that a hypothesis is, religious belief is not "ordinary belief" like a belief in a proposition. He argued that religious utterances are to be understood as "declarations of adherence to a policy of action, declarations of commitment to a way of life". A religious belief is an "intention to behave in a certain way together with the entertainment of certain stories associated with the intention in the mind of the believer". These stories "might psychologically support the resolution but it does not logically justify it". He also spoke about religious contradictions, which Braithwaite believed were permissible, in contrast to contradictions of empirical propositions where believing contradictions is "disastrous" due to the "courses of action appropriate" to these propositions being incompatible.

Braithwaite remarked on a difference between secular morality and religious morality, with secular morality being focused on conduct or 'external life' whereas religious morality focused on both inner life and "outward conduct". This meant that "the superiority of religious conviction over the mere adoption of a moral code in securing conformity to the code arises from a religious conviction changing what the religious man wants. It may be hard enough to love your enemy, but once you have succeeded in doing so it is easy to behave lovingly towards him. But if you continue to hate him, it requires heroic perseverance continually to behave as if you loved him. Resolutions to feel, even if they are only partly fulfilled, are powerful reinforcements of resolutions to act". He also argued that one aspect of all 'moral theistic religions' which was of "great psychological value", in that it enabled religious individuals to persevere, was that they are performing the will of God.

His major work was his book Scientific Explanation: A Study of the Function of Theory, Probability and Law in Science (1953) but, like his Eddington Lecture it was his inaugural lecture ("Theory of Games as a Tool for the Moral Philosopher") that was his more original contribution: although a logician and philosopher of science, he had been elected to a chair of moral philosophy (ethics) about which he considered he knew little. His inaugural lecture attempted to bring what he did know about the theory of games into some relation with ethical reasoning and, in doing that, he effectively started a whole new field of study, namely, how game-theoretic considerations are related to ethical ones. The topic of the lecture was the bargaining approach to distributive justice. In early writings, he called game theories 'a tool for the moral philosopher'.

After his retirement in 1967, Braithwaite was a visiting professor at Johns Hopkins University where he lectured on game theory and encouraged one of his students, Alexander Rosenberg, to apply the approach of Scientific Explanation to economics.

It was Braithwaite's poker that Ludwig Wittgenstein reportedly brandished at Karl Popper during their confrontation at a Moral Sciences Club meeting in Braithwaite's rooms in King's. The implement subsequently disappeared. Braithwaite was a friend of Frank P. Ramsey (about whom he was interviewed by D. H. Mellor on BBC Radio in 1978) and, after Ramsey's early death, edited a collection of his papers.

A Festschrift, Science, Belief and Behaviour: Essays in Honour of R. B. Braithwaite, edited by D. H. Mellor, was published in 1980. It included essay contributions from Mellor himself and Ian Hacking amongst others.

== Personal life ==
Braithwaite married Dorothea Cotter, the daughter of the educationist and writer Theodore Morison, in 1925. Following her death in 1928, Braithwaite later married Margaret Masterman, a linguist and philosopher, on 18 October 1932. The couple had two children, and together founded the Epiphany Philosophers a group of (largely) Anglicans and Quakers seeking a new view of the relationship between philosophy and science.

Braithwaite died from pneumonia on 21 April 1990, at a nursing home in Bottisham, Cambridgeshire aged 90. His ashes were interred in Cambridge at King's College Chapel.

== Select publications ==
- Moral principles and inductive policies (1952) [from Proceedings of the British Academy 36 (1950): 51–68.]
- Scientific Explanation: A Study of the Function of Theory, Probability and Law in Science (1953)
- Theory of Games as a Tool for the Moral Philosopher (1955)
- An Empiricist's View of the Nature of Religious Belief (1955)

For a more complete list of works see "Bibliography of the philosophical writings of R. B. Braithwaite" or his entry at PhilPapers.
