= Arvi Hurskainen =

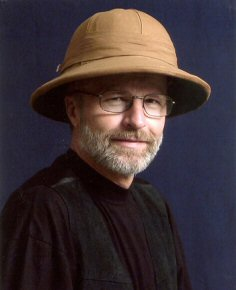
- Arvi Hurskainen in 2002
- Born: 25 January 1941 (age 85); Kitee, Finland
- Known for: developing SALAMA, a computational environment for language technology
- Scientific career
- Fields: Linguistics Language technology, Machine translation
- Institutions: University of Helsinki
- Doctoral advisors: Juha Pentikäinen and Marja-Liisa Swantz

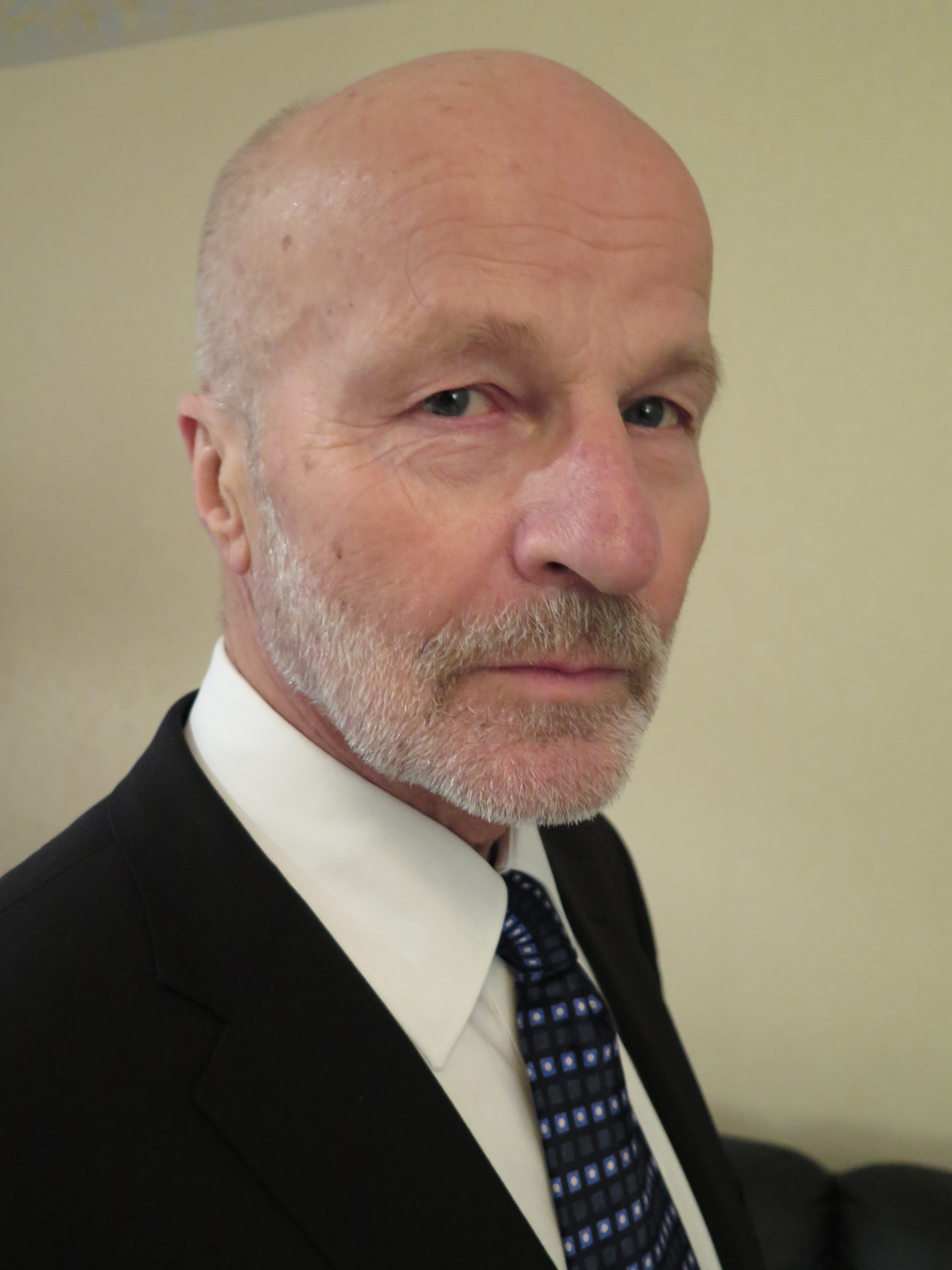
Arvi Hurskainen in 2016

Arvi Johannes Hurskainen (born 25 January 1941 in Kitee) is a Finnish scholar of language technology and linguistics. Since 1985, he has developed rule-based language technology mainly for Swahili, but also for other languages, including machine translation from English to Finnish. He has created a development environment called SALAMA (acronym for Swahili Language Manager), but it suits to any language. The major applications developed so far include the following: the spell checker for Swahili, the annotator of corpus texts, an advanced dictionary between Swahili and English and translators from Swahili to English, from English to Swahili, and from English to Finnish. He has also developed an advanced learning system for Swahili and a system for producing targeted vocabularies for language learners. Hurskainen has compiled two annotated corpora, Helsinki Corpus of Swahili 1.0 and Helsinki Corpus of Swahili 2.0.

== Study and work history ==
He first studied theology at the University of Helsinki. Later, after having worked in Tanzania, he studied anthropology and published his PhD dissertation Cattle and Culture. The Structure of a Pastoral Parakujo Society. In 1976, he worked as a researcher in Jipemoyo Project, sponsored by the Academy of Finland in Tanzania, and in 1977–1980, in the service of the Finnish Lutheran Mission in Helsinki.

Hurskainen worked at the University of Helsinki, first as a lecturer in 1981–1989 and then as a professor in 1989–2006. In between, in 1984–1985, he worked at Tumaini University in Tanzania. Before the university career, he worked in Tanzania for eight years in various teaching tasks. He was the director of the Department of Asian and African Studies in 1999–2001. He retired in 2006.

In 1988–1992, he directed the fieldwork project Swahili Language and Folklore, sponsored by the Ministry of Foreign Affairs, Finland and the University of Dar-es-Salaam. The project produced the speech corpus DAHE (Dar-es-Salaam - Helsinki), which was later digitized.

== Language technology ==
Hurskainen has developed language technology by making use of detailed language analysis. The basic description of language is made using the finite-state transducers, first developed by Kimmo Koskenniemi. The individual words are then disambiguated using constraint grammar technology. Also, the syntactic mapping is performed in this phase. Disambiguation and syntactic mapping are performed using Constraint Grammar 3.0, originally developed by Fred Karlsson and implemented by Pasi Tapanainen from Connexor.

The rule-based approach developed by Hurskainen has similarities with other rule-based systems, such as Grammatical Framework and Nooj. Rule-based approaches to language technology, especially as they apply to machine translation, are considered suitable for low-resource languages with rich morphology, such as Bantu languages.

== Production ==
=== Web material ===
- SALAMA, a computational environment for developing language technology applications, was initiated in 1985, and the development continues.
- At the moment, there are 102 technical reports on language technology, mainly on issues related to machine translation.
