= International Committee on Computational Linguistics =

The International Committee on Computational Linguistics (ICCL) was founded by Dr. David Hays of the RAND Corporation in 1965 to promote the biennial International Conference on Computational Linguistics, which since the third conference in Stockholm is known by the acronym COLING after the Swedish fictional character Kolingen by Albert Engström. The current President of ICCL is Professor Jun-Ichi Tsujii of the AIRC and membership of the committee is permanent.

== List of COLING Conferences ==
- 1965 New York City (Chair David G. Hays)
- 1967 Grenoble (Chair Bernard Vauquois)
- 1969 Stockholm (Chair Hans Karlgren)
- 1971 Debrecen (Chair Ferenc Kiefer)
- 1973 Pisa (Chair Antonio Zampolli)
- 1976 Ottawa (Chair Brian Harris)
- 1978 Bergen (Chair Kolbjørn Hæggstad)
- 1980 Tokyo (Chair David G. Hays)
- 1982 Prague (Chair Ján Horecký)
- 1984 Stanford (Chair Yorick Wilks)
- 1986 Bonn (Chair Makoto Nagao)
- 1988 Budapest (Chair Eva Hajičová)
- 1990 Helsinki (Chair Hans Karlgren)
- 1992 Nantes (Chair Antonio Zampolli)
- 1994 Kyoto (Chair Makoto Nagao)
- 1996 Copenhagen (Chair Junichi Tsuji)
- 1998 Montreal (Chairs Christian Boitet and Pete Whitelock)
- 2000 Saarbrücken (Chair Martin Kay)
- 2002 Taipei (Chair Winfried Lenders)
- 2004 Geneva (Chair Sergei Nirenburg)
- 2006 Sydney (Chair Nicoletta Calzolari)
- 2008 Manchester (Chairs Donia Scott and Hans Uszkoreit)
- 2010 Beijing (Chair Aravind Joshi)
- 2012 Mumbai (Chairs Martin Kay and Christian Boitet)
- 2014 Dublin (Chairs Josef Van Genabith and Andy Way)
- 2016 Osaka (Chair Nicoletta Calzolari)
- 2018 Santa Fe (Chair Pierre Isabelle)
- 2020 Barcelona (Chair Donia Scott)
- 2022 Gyeongju (Chairs Nicoletta Calzolari and Chu-Ren Huang)
- 2024 Turin collocated with the Language Resources and Evaluation Conference LREC.
- 2025 Abu Dhabi.
