= Lauri Karttunen =

American linguist (1941–2022)

Lauri Juhani Karttunen (September 29, 1941 – March 20, 2022) was an American linguist and adjunct professor in linguistics at Stanford and an ACL Fellow.

== Early life and career ==
Born in Finland, Karttunen studied the Finnish language at the University of Helsinki from 1960 to 1964. He received his Ph.D. in Linguistics in 1969 from Indiana University in Bloomington. At the University of Texas at Austin in the 1970s he worked mostly on semantics. He published a series of seminal papers on discourse referents, presuppositions, implicative verbs, conventional implicatures, and questions. In the 1980s Karttunen became, along with Ronald M. Kaplan, Martin Kay, and Kimmo Koskenniemi, one of the pioneers in computational linguistics on the application of finite-state transducers to phonology and morphology. Karttunen and Kenneth R. Beesley published a textbook on Finite State Morphology and a set of applications for creating morphological analyzers. Commercial versions of the finite-state technology developed by Karttunen and his colleagues at PARC and XRCE have been licensed by Xerox to many companies including SAP and Microsoft. Karttunen retired from PARC in 2011. He worked on Language and Natural Reasoning at CSLI.

== Honors ==
The Association for Computational Linguistics (ACL) gives each year at its Annual Meeting a "Lifetime Achievement Award." At the age of 66, Karttunen became so far the youngest recipient of the award at the 45th Meeting in Prague in 2007. In 2009 the Indiana Linguistics Department gave Karttunen a Distinguished Alumni Award. In 2011 ACL created an ACL Fellows Program. Karttunen was one of the seventeen selected for the founding group of ACL Fellows "whose contributions to the field have been most extraordinary." The European META-NET organization awarded Karttunen's XFST (Xerox Finite-State Toolkit) application a META-Seal of Recognition at the 2012 Meeting in Brussels "for software products and services that actively contribute to the European Multilingual Information Society."

== Selected articles ==
- Discourse Referents. In Semantics: Critical Concepts in Linguistics. Javeier Gutiérrez-Rexach (ed.), Vol. III, pages 20–39. Routledge, 2003. Also in Syntax and Semantics 7: Notes from the Linguistic Underground, 363-85, J. D. McCawley (ed.), Academic Press, New York 1976. The first published version of the paper appeared in the Proceedings of Coling'69.
- Syntax and Semantics of Questions. In Formal Semantics. The Essential Readings. Paul Portner and Barbara H. Partee (eds.), pages 382–420. Blackwell, 2003. Also in Semantics: Critical Concepts in Linguistics. Javeier Gutiérrez-Rexach (ed.), Vol. V, pages 207–249. Routledge, 2003 and in Questions, H. Hiz (ed.), pages 165-210, Reidel, Dordrecht 1978. Originally appeared in Linguistics and Philosophy 1 1-44, 1977.
- Presupposition and Linguistic Context. Theoretical Linguistics 1 181–94, 1974. Also in Pragmatics: A Reader, Steven Davis (ed.), pages 406-415, Oxford University Press, 1991. Translation: Presuposición y contexto lingüistico. In Textos clásicos de pragmática, pages 175-192, María Teresea Julio and Ricardo Muños (eds.), Arco Libros, Madrid 1998.
- The Logic of English Predicate Complement Constructions. Publications of the Indiana University Linguistics Club, Bloomington 1971. Translations: Die Logik englischer Prädikatkomplement-konstruktionen. in Generative Semantik, 243–78, W. Abraham and R. Binnick (eds.), Athenaeum, Frankfurt 1973; La logique des constructions anglaises à complément prédicatif. Langages 8 56–80, 1973.
- Conventional Implicature. (with Stanley Peters) In Syntax and Semantics 11, Presupposition, pages 1–56, C.-K. Oh and D. A. Dinneen (eds.), Academic Press, New York 1979.
- Texas Linguistic Forum, Vol. 22. 1983 A special issue on Two-level morphology introducing the kimmo system.
- Finite-state Constraints In the Proceedings of the International Conference on Current Issues in Computational Linguistics, June 10–14, 1991. Universiti Sains Malaysia, Penang, Malaysia. Also in The Last Phonological Rule. J. Goldsmith (ed.), pages 173–194, University of Chicago Press, 1993.
- Computing with Realizational Morphology In Computational Linguistics and Intelligent Text Processing, Alexander Gelbukh (ed.), Lecture Notes in Computer Science, Volume 2588, pages 205–216, Springer Verlag, Heidelberg. 2003.
- The Insufficiency of Paper-and-Pencil Linguistics: the Case of Finnish Prosody In Intelligent Linguistic Architectures: Variations on themes by Ronald M. Kaplan, Miriam Butt, Mary Dalrymple, and Tracy Holloway King (eds.), pages 287–300, CSLI Publications, Stanford, California, 2006.

Awards
Preceded by Eva Hajičová	ACL Lifetime Achievement Award; 2007	Succeeded by Yorick Wilks
