= ICCL =

ICCL may refer to:

- International Committee on Computational Linguistics
- International Council of Cruise Lines
- Irish Council for Civil Liberties
- Short for "I couldn't care less," an idiomatic expression indicating lack of interest.
