= Ján Horecký =

Ján Horecký may refer to:

- Ján Horecký (linguist), Slovak linguist (1920—2006)
- Ján Horecký (minister), born 1968, Minister of Education, Science, Research and Sport of Slovakia (2022-present)
