= Tsujii =

Tsujii (written: 辻井) is a Japanese surname. Notable people with the surname include:

- Jun'ichi Tsujii (辻井 潤一, born 1949), Japanese computer scientist
- Nobuyuki Tsujii (辻井 伸行, born 1988), Japanese pianist and composer
- Tsujii Takashi (辻井 喬, born 1927), Japanese writer and poet, pen-name of Tsutsumi Seiji, Japanese businessman
