= Kimmo Koskenniemi =

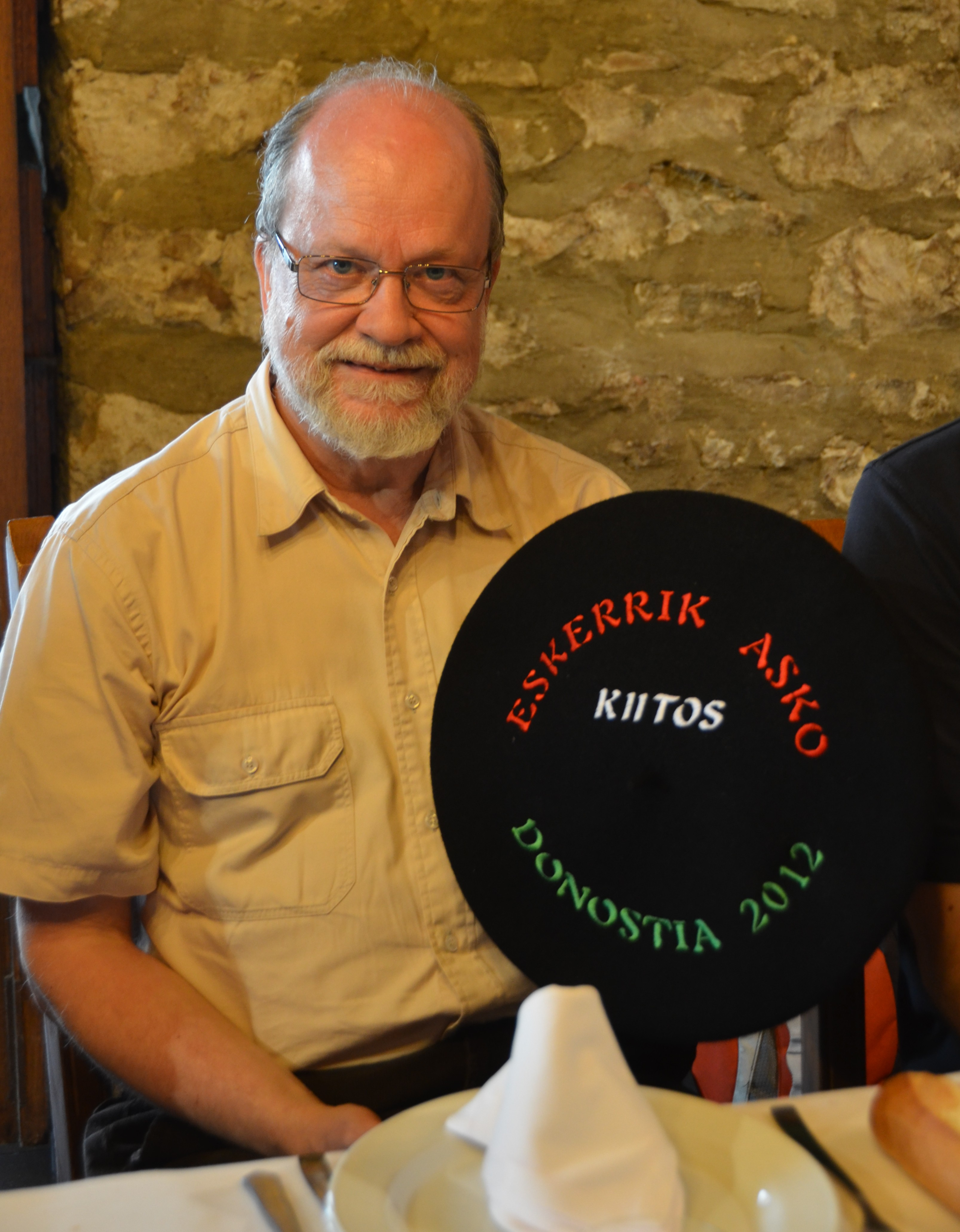
Kimmo Koskenniemi, 2012

Kimmo Matti Koskenniemi (born 7 September 1945) is the inventor of finite-state two-level models for computational phonology and morphology. He was a professor of Computational Linguistics at the University of Helsinki, Finland. In the early 1980s Koskenniemi's work became accessible by early adopters such as Lauri Karttunen, Ronald M. Kaplan and Martin Kay, first at the University of Texas Austin, later at the Xerox Palo Alto Research Center.

This application of finite-state transducers to phonology and morphology was initially implemented for Finnish, but it soon proved to be useful for other languages with complex morphology such as Basque and Swahili.

== Bibliography ==
- Koskenniemi, Kimmo 1983: Two-level morphology : a general computational model for word-form recognition and production. Publications (Helsingin yliopisto. Yleisen kieliteteen laitos 11)
