= Hurskainen =

Hurskainen is a surname. Notable people with the surname include:

- Arvi Hurskainen (born 1941), Finnish academic
- Henri Hurskainen (born 1986), Swedish badminton player
- Lassi Hurskainen (born 1987), Finnish footballer
