= Eva Hajičová =

Czech linguist

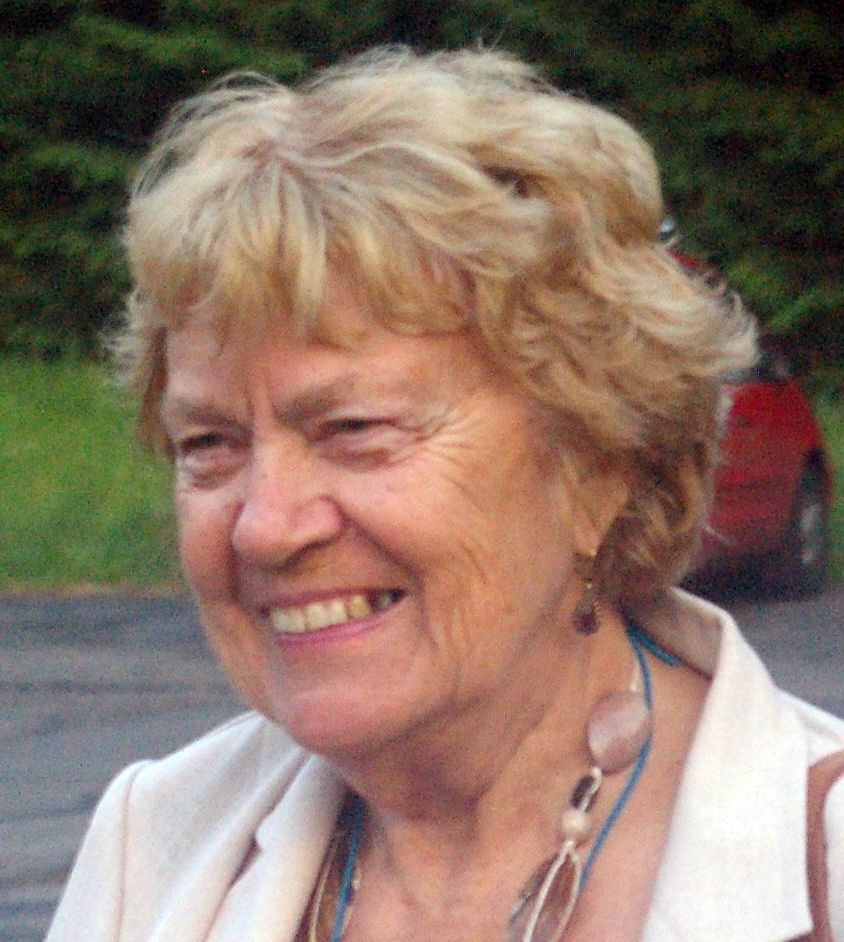
- Born: 23 August 1935 (age 91); Prague, Czechoslovakia
- Education: Charles University
- Scientific career
- Fields: Linguistics
- Workplaces: Faculty of Mathematics and Physics, Charles University

Eva Hajičová [ˈɛva ˈɦajɪt͡ʃovaː] (born 23 August 1935) is a Czech linguist, specializing in topic–focus articulation and corpus linguistics. In 2006, she was awarded the Association for Computational Linguistics (ACL) Lifetime Achievement Award. She was named a fellow of the ACL in 2011.

== Biography ==
Hajičová got an undergraduate degree in English and Czech in 1958 from Charles University in Prague, Czech Republic. She went on to graduate with a PhD and a DrSc (Doctor of Sciences) degree in general and computational linguistics. She works at her Alma mater, Charles University, where her research interest areas include corpus linguistics, as well as computational areas in semantic and syntactic sentence structure

Her participation in research has reached many publications, organizations, and boards. Such journal involvements include “Kybernetika”, “Computers and Artificial Intelligence”, “Journal of Pragmatics”, and “Linguistica Pragensia”.

She also became a part of research or intellectually focused organizations, with membership in the International Committee of Computational Linguistics from 1978 to present, first chair and founding board member of the European Chapter of the Association for Computational Linguistics from 1982 to 1987, chairpersonship of the Prague Linguistic Circle from 1997 to 2006, presidency and fellowship in the International Association for Computational Linguistics in 1998, elected membership in the Learned Society of Czech Republic from 2004 to present, and presidency and honorary membership in the Societas Linguistica Europaea from 2006 to 2007.

== Honors and awards ==
| Year | Award | Reason |
|---|---|---|
| 1995 | Alexander Von Humboldt Research Prize | |
| 2003 | The Medal of the Minister of Education of Czech Republic | Recognition of the pedagogical and scientific work in computational linguistics. |
| 2006 | ACL Life Achievement Award | |
| 2017 | Josef Hlávka Medal | Life-time achievements in science and arts. |
| 2018 | Antonio Zampolli Prize | Outstanding contributions to the advancement of language resources and language technology evaluation within human language technologies. |
| 2023 | Neil and Saras Smith Medal | Lifetime achievement in the study of linguistics. |

== Research ==
In the book The Meaning of the Sentence in Its Semantic and Pragmatic Aspects she and her two co-authors, Petr Sgall and Jarmila Panevová, formulate a new description of natural language termed Functional Generative Description (FGD). The description is dependency-based, integrating both the syntactic structure of natural language and the topic-focus articulation, or the information that is intended for communication. The method is not English bound, and strives to be a universal grammar descriptor.

She assisted in creating and updating The Prague Dependency Treebank, a database of Czech Language annotated with three tiers of linguistic information. The lowest level is the morphological annotation about the structure of the individual words, the second level is termed the analytical level, and is marked with syntactic information. The highest level of annotation is called the tectogrammatical level (deep syntax), and shows the dependencies and relationships between the words.

== Selected publications ==
- Hajic, J., Panevová, J., Hajicová, E., Sgall, P., Pajas, P., Štepánek, J., ... & Urešová, Z. 2006. Prague dependency treebank 2.0. CD-ROM, linguistic data consortium, LDC Catalog No.: LDC2006T01, Philadelphia, 98.
- Hajicová, E., B.H. Partee, and P. Sgall. 1998. Topic-focus articulation, tripartite structures and semantic content. Dordrecht: Kluwer Academic Publishers. ISBN 9789401590129
- Hajičová, E., 1993. Issues of sentence structure and discourse patterns (Vol. 2). Charles University.
- Hajičová, E., 1985. Topic, and focus. In Contributions to functional syntax, semantics and language comprehension (p. 189). John Benjamins.
  Sgall, P., Eva
- Hajicová, Jarmila Panevová. 1986 -The Meaning of the Sentence in Its Semantic and Pragmatic Aspects. Springer Science & Business Media. ISBN 9789027718389

| Preceded by Martin Kay | ACL Lifetime Achievement Award; 2006 | Succeeded by Lauri Karttunen |
