= Brian Harris (translation researcher) =

British-Canadian translation researcher

- Born: London, England
- Education: School of Oriental and African Studies; American University in Cairo; Quai d'Orsay archives
- Known for: Machine translation research Canada's first computer-assisted translation course Natural translation theory Interpreting in the Community (Critical Link)
- Scientific career
- Fields: Linguistics, translation, computer science
- Workplaces: National Film Board of Canada; Université de Montréal; University of Ottawa; Canadian Council of Ministers of Education
- Academic advisors: Bernard Lewis; Alain Colmerauer

Brian Harris is a Canadian and British translation researcher.

== Early life and education ==
Harris was born in 1929. He was brought up in London, where he took degrees in Classical Arabic and in Middle East History at the School of Oriental and African Studies. He also studied at the American University in Cairo, and did postgraduate work on Lebanese history under Bernard Lewis, the leading Western authority on the Ottoman Empire. Lewis arranged for him to do research in the archives of the Quai d'Orsay in Paris.

== Career ==
Harris first visited Spain in 1947, and returned to work there in the tourist industry in the 1950s. In 1965 he emigrated to Canada and taught English as a Second Language for several years at the National Film Board of Canada in Montreal. From 1966 to 1972, he worked as a research assistant in the Machine Translation Project (Cétadol, later renamed TAUM) at the Université de Montréal under French computer scientist Alain Colmerauer (inventor of the programming language Prolog and a Chevalier de Légion d'Honneur). He was co-opted to the International Committee on Computational Linguistics and co-organised its conference in Ottawa, Canada in 1976.

In 1972, Harris moved to the University of Ottawa, where he started a computerised documentation centre for linguistics and did research on information retrieval.

Having come to the conclusion that "the problem with research on machine translation is that we don't know enough about translation", he turned to researching the translations done by children. He coined the term 'translatology' for the scientific study of translation. In 1978, he and an assistant, Bianca Sherwood, published Translation as an Innate Skill, which has been described as the seminal article on natural translation (translation by unskilled translators).

In 1974, he began teaching translation theory at the University of Ottawa's School of Translators and Interpreters. From 1975 to 1979, and again from 1992 until his retirement in 1994, he was Director of the School. In 1976, he introduced into the School’s programme Canada’s first computer-assisted translation course.

In 1980 he started the School's conference interpreter training program with Roda Roberts. It has trained a generation of young Canadian interpreters in cooperation with the Canadian government and until recently was the only university conference interpretation programme in Canada. Soon afterwards, also with Roda Roberts, he started the first Spanish translation degree program in a Canadian university. This led eventually to a very beneficial collaboration with the Universidad de Valladolid in Spain and to visits from other Spanish academics. He taught Arabic to English translation for a year at the University of Jordan in Amman, and at the King Fahd Advanced School of Translation in Tangier. He has also taught and lectured in other countries.

In 1988, Harris published one of the first articles on translation memories (which he called "bitexts") and designed software for them.

Parallel to his academic career, Harris has also had a professional career as an interpreter. He began as a tourist and business interpreter in Barcelona and London in the 1950s and then took up conference interpreting when he moved to Canada. He interpreted at the Olympic Games in Montreal in 1976, for the Canadian Council of Ministers of Education, etc. He is certified as a translator and conference interpreter under the legislation of the province of Ontario.` He served as president of that province's Association of Translators and Interpreters and as president of the national Canadian Translators and Interpreters Council; he was a member of the Council of the International Federation of Translators. He is still on the Reading Committee of the FIT journal Babel.

Having become interested in court and community interpreting, Harris founded and chaired the Canadian national organizing committee of the first and second editions of the International Conference on Interpreting in the Community, known as the Critical Link.

=== Translatology ===
In the 1970s, after reading Eugene Nida’s Toward A Science Of Translation, Harris asked himself why there was no English term for "science of translation". He reasoned that "phonetics" is used rather than "science of speech sounds". There was discussion that a term similar to "phonetics" was needed. In 1972, Harris proposed "translatology". At the same time a French professor of translation, René Ladmiral, introduced traductologie in French. Traductologie caught on and was soon borrowed into other Romance languages as traductología, etc.; translatology never caught on and was eclipsed by ‘translation studies’, though a few people still use it.

=== Natural translation ===
Natural translation is Harris' most important contribution to translation studies. In the early 1970s he began to notice that while he was supposedly teaching university students to translate, many people were doing translation successfully without such training; indeed that the untrained translators were doing more translating than the trained ones and often to just as high a standard. Many of the interpreters Harris also worked with, including some from the Parliament of Canada, had never had formal training. This led Harris to the conclusion that all bilinguals can translate within certain limits.

Harris was not the first to believe this; it had already been stated by his friend Alexander Lyudskanov a few years earlier. Lyudskanov said, "Thanks to a certain intuition and to habit, every bilingual translates in some way or other." However he had not realised the significance of his statement. Something similar happened with another of Harris' observation, namely that young children can translate. This had been documented decades earlier, in 1913, by the French linguist Jules Ronjat, but his discovery was rarely replicated and nobody cited him. Then Harris had the good fortune that an educational psychologist at the University of Toronto named Merrill Swain, who was doing research on children in French immersion schools, had collected several months of recordings of a young bilingual French Canadian boy which contained many examples of him translating; and as translation was not the focus of her research, she generously handed the data over to Harris. He went through it with an assistant, Bianca Sherwood, and from it Harris was able to construct a first approximation of a developmental model of the onset of translating ability. This was the initial Natural Translation Hypothesis.

After that Harris continued the study, inspired by the discovery, also by Merill Swain, that children do not all translate the same way. The following sums up the initial MT Hypothesis:

1. All bilinguals can translate, although their competence is limited by their proficiency in the two languages, by their knowledge and experience in general, and by their cognitive development.

2. Therefore bilingualism is a triple competence − two languages plus translating − with the translating competence automatically accompanying the other two.

3. The triple competence can become manifest at any age, but most strikingly in young children. Indeed it is observable in children so young, without training and with so little exposure to it, that we can hypothesise it is innate.

At this point, Harris' data had all come from European languages. But in 1994 one of his students presented a thesis study of African children which extended it to a very different culture and language, and supported the case for natural translation being universal. Since then Harris has extended the initial model in several directions:

1. Clearly there is a big developmental distance to cover between the natural translation of a very young child or a beginner in language learning and the skilled productions of expert and professional translators. The extended model proposes two paths for this development. One of them is what is traditionally regarded as translator training, such as university courses or work placements, or probation under an experienced translator; and it typically ends in a degree or a professional qualification.

2. The other is self-learning by imitation and absorption of existing tokens of translation and of texts, in the way that speakers learn their native language. For this Harris borrowed a term from Gideon Toury: native translation.

The paths are not mutually exclusive; a budding translator may progress by a combination of the two. Harris divided the native translators, according to ability, into beginner and advanced.

3. Returning to the question of the "third competence" that was outlined in the initial hypothesis, Harris abandoned it insofar as it was supposed to be something specific to translating. Instead he suggested that it was a specialization of a much more general human competence: conversion. Harris gave examples of non-linguistic conversion such as driving on different sides of the road. According to Ludskanov everything is represented in our minds by signs and therefore the conversions required for translating are conversions of signs.
