= Makoto Nagao =

Japanese computer scientist (1936–2021)

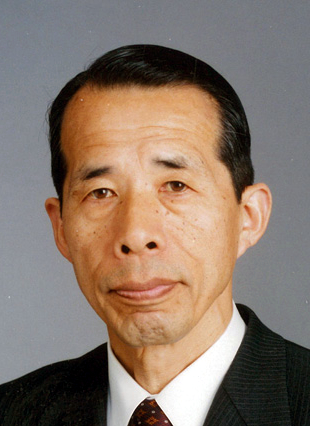
- Makoto Nagao
- Born: October 4, 1936; Mie Prefecture, Japan
- Died: May 23, 2021 (aged 84); Kyoto, Japan
- Education: Kyoto University
- Known for: example-based machine translation, natural language processing for Japanese, various image processing approaches, researches for digital library
- Awards: IEEE Emanuel R. Piore Award, ACL Lifetime Achievement Award, Japan Prize
- Scientific career
- Fields: Computer Science
- Workplaces: Kyoto University, National Diet Library
- Notable students: Takeo Kanade, Jun'ichi Tsujii, Yuji Matsumoto, Sadao Kurohashi

Makoto Nagao (長尾 真, Nagao Makoto; October 4, 1936 – May 23, 2021) was a Japanese computer scientist. He contributed to various fields: machine translation, natural language processing, pattern recognition, image processing and library science. He was the 23rd president of Kyoto University (1997–2003) and the 14th director of National Diet Library in Japan (2007–2012).

== Early life and career ==
Born and raised in Mie Prefecture, Japan, Makoto Nagao graduated from Kyoto University in 1959, and received a master's degree in engineering in 1961 and a Ph.D. in engineering in 1966 from the university. In Kyoto University, he became an assistant professor in 1967, an associate professor in 1968, and a professor in 1973. He served as the 23rd president of Kyoto University (1997–2003). After retirement from the university, he was appointed to the director of National Diet Library in 2007 and held the position until 2012.

He was the 20th director of the Information Processing Society of Japan (IPSJ) (1999–2000). Each year since 2005, IPSJ Nagao Special Researcher Award has been awarded to young Japanese computer scientists who accomplished notable research.

He was the first president of the Asia-Pacific Association for Machine Translation (AAMT), and in each year from 2006, AAMT Nagao Award is awarded to individuals or groups who made contribution to machine translation.

== Work ==
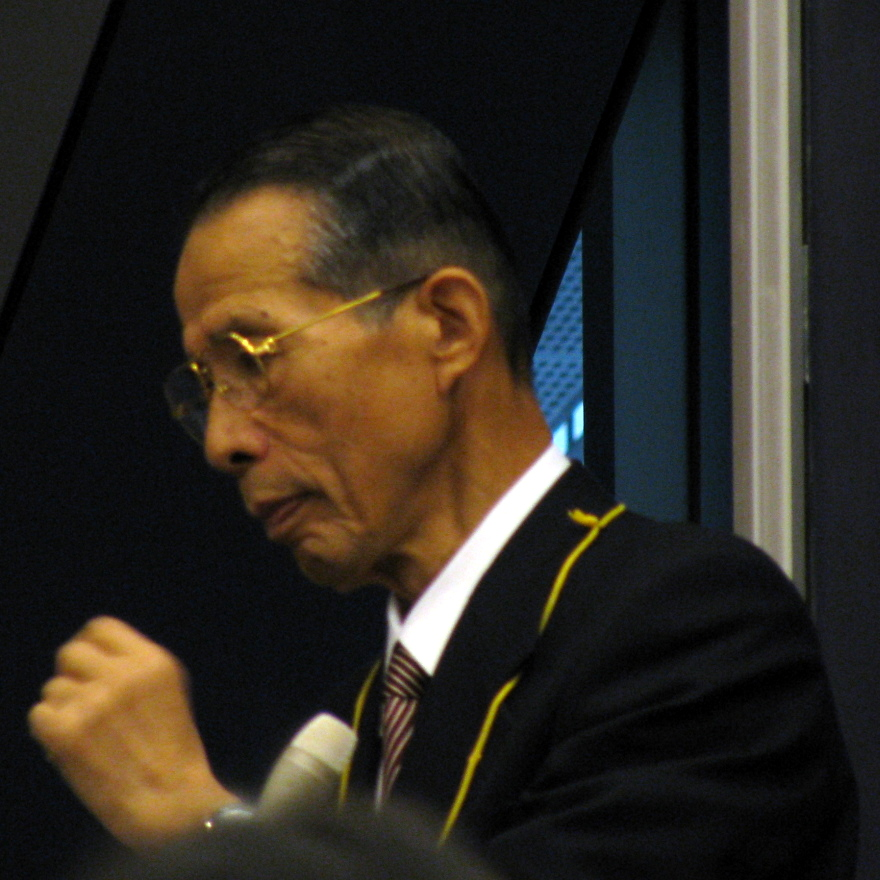
at Wikimedia Conference Japan (November 22, 2009)

Nagao was one of the first scientists who developed practical machine translation (MT) systems. Between 1982 and 1986, he led the Mu project which aimed at translations for technical papers and became the first successful MT system between English and Japanese. In addition, example-based machine translation, an important approach for MT, is the method proposed by him in the early 1980s. In 1984 he introduced the analogy principle into the machine translation, which is adapted to the translation between two totally different languages, such as Japanese and English.

He was also a pioneer of natural language processing (NLP) for the Japanese language. In 1994, he created KNP, a dependency analyzer for Japanese, with Sadao Kurohashi. In the 1990s, he directed a project to make a Japanese parsed corpus, which is now called Kyoto University Text Corpus. Another NLP resource developed under his laboratory is Juman, a Japanese morphological parser and the first system which merged word segmentation and morphological analysis for languages which do not have explicit word boundaries (such as Japanese or Chinese).

In pattern recognition and image processing, he was the first engineer who applied feedback analysis mechanisms to facial recognition systems, and he introduced various artificial intelligence techniques into the image processing.

He supervised the Ariadne software system, a digital library system, which made an impact upon digital library research in Japan and over the world. While the National Diet Library of Japan holds a traditional slogan "Truth makes us free" (John 8:32), a new slogan "Through knowledge we prosper" was proposed by him as the director. He gave a keynote lecture in the Wikimedia Conference Japan 2009.

== Death ==
Nagao died from a stroke on 23 May 2021 at the age of 84.

== Honors and awards ==
- 1993: IEEE Emanuel R. Piore Award
- 1997: Medal of Honour with Purple Ribbon
- 1997: International Association for Machine Translation's Award of Honor
- 1999: C&C Prize
- 2003: ACL Lifetime Achievement Award
- 2004: Professor Emeritus of Kyoto University
- 2005: Japan Prize
- 2005: Chevalier de la Légion d'honneur
- 2008: Person of Cultural Merit
- 2018: Order of Culture
- 2019: Okawa Prize
- 2020: Asian Scientist 100, Asian Scientist

| Preceded by Aravind Joshi | ACL Lifetime Achievement Award; 2003 | Succeeded by Karen Spärck Jones |
Academic offices
| Preceded by Hiroo Imura | President of Kyoto University; 1997–2003 | Succeeded by Kazuo Oike |
