= National Centre for Text Mining =

UK academic institution

National Centre for Text Mining (NaCTeM)
- Established: 2004; 22 years ago
- Parent institution: Department of Computer Science, University of Manchester
- Affiliations: University of Manchester
- Director: Sophia Ananiadou
- Location: Manchester, United Kingdom
- Website: www.nactem.ac.uk

The National Centre for Text Mining (NaCTeM) is a publicly funded text mining (TM) centre. It was established to provide support, advice and information on TM technologies and to disseminate information within the larger TM community, while also providing services and tools in response to the requirements of the United Kingdom academic community.

The software tools and services which NaCTeM supplies allow researchers to apply text mining techniques to problems within their specific areas of interest – examples of these tools are highlighted below. In addition to providing services, the centre is also involved in, and makes significant contributions to, the text mining research community both nationally and internationally in initiatives such as Europe PubMed Central.

The centre is located in the Manchester Institute of Biotechnology and is operated and organised by the Department of Computer Science, University of Manchester. NaCTeM contributes expertise in natural language processing and information extraction, including named-entity recognition, and extractions of complex relationships (or events) that hold between named entities, along with parallel and distributed data mining systems in biomedical and clinical applications.

== Services ==
=== TerMine ===
TerMine is a domain independent method for automatic term recognition which can be used to help locate the most important terms in a document and automatically rank them.

=== AcroMine ===
AcroMine finds all known expanded forms of acronyms as they have appeared in Medline entries or conversely, it can be used to find possible acronyms of expanded forms as they have previously appeared in Medline and disambiguates them.

=== Medie ===
Medie is an intelligent search engine for the semantic retrieval of sentences containing biomedical correlations from Medline abstracts.

=== Facta+ ===
Facta+ is a Medline search engine for finding associations between biomedical concepts.

=== Facta+ Visualizer ===
Facta+ Visualizer is a web application that aids in understanding FACTA+ search results through intuitive graphical visualisation.

=== KLEIO ===
KLEIO is a faceted semantic information retrieval system over Medline abstracts.

=== Europe PMC EvidenceFinder ===
Europe PMC EvidenceFinder Europe PMC EvidenceFinder helps users to explore facts that involve entities of interest within the full text articles of the Europe PubMed Central database.

=== EUPMC Evidence Finder for Anatomical entities with meta-knowledge ===
EUPMC Evidence Finder for Anatomical entities with meta-knowledge is similar to the Europe PMC EvidenceFinder, allowing exploration of facts involving anatomical entities within the full text articles of the Europe PubMed Central database. Facts can be filtered according to various aspects of their interpretation (e.g., negation, certainly level, novelty).

=== Info-PubMed ===
Info-PubMed provides information and graphical representation of biomedical interactions extracted from Medline using deep semantic parsing technology. This is supplemented with a term dictionary consisting of over 200,000 protein/gene names and identification of disease types and organisms.

=== Clinical Trial Protocols (ASCOT) ===
ASCOT is an efficient, semantically enhanced search application, customised for clinical trial documents.

=== History of Medicine (HOM) ===
HOM is a semantic search system over historical medical document archives

== Resources ==
=== BioLexicon ===
BioLexicon is a large-scale terminological resource for the biomedical domain.

=== GENIA ===
GENIA is a collection of reference materials for the development of biomedical text mining systems.

=== GREC ===
GREC is a semantically annotated corpus of Medline abstracts intended for training IE systems and/or resources which are used to extract events from biomedical literature.

=== Metabolite and Enzyme Corpus ===
This is a corpus of Medline abstracts annotated by experts with metabolite and enzyme names.

=== Anatomy Corpora ===
A collection of corpora manually annotated with fine-grained, species-independent anatomical entities, to facilitate the development of text mining systems that can carry out detailed and comprehensive analyses of biomedical scientific text.

=== Meta-knowledge corpus ===
This is an enrichment of the GENIA Event corpus, in which events are enriched with various levels of information pertaining to their interpretation. The aim is to allow systems to be trained that can distinguish between events that factual information or experimental analyses, definite information from speculated information, etc.

== Projects ==
=== Argo ===
The objective of the Argo project is to develop a workbench for analysing (primarily annotating) textual data. The workbench, which is accessed as a web application, supports the combination of elementary text-processing components to form comprehensive processing workflows. It provides functionality to manually intervene in the otherwise automatic process of annotation by correcting or creating new annotations, and facilitates user collaboration by providing sharing capabilities for user-owned resources. Argo benefits users such as text-analysis designers by providing an integrated environment for the development of processing workflows; annotators/curators by providing manual annotation functionalities supported by automatic pre-processing and post-processing; and developers by providing a workbench for testing and evaluating text analytics.

=== Big Mechanism ===
Big mechanisms are large, explanatory models of complicated systems in which interactions have important causal effects. Whilst the collection of big data is increasingly automated, the creation of big mechanisms remains a largely human effort, which is becoming increasingly challenging, according to the fragmentation and distribution of knowledge. The ability to automate the construction of big mechanisms could have a major impact on scientific research. As one of a number of different projects that make up the big mechanism programme, funded by DARPA, the aim is to assemble an overarching big mechanism from the literature and prior experiments and to utilise this for the probabilistic interpretation of new patient panomics data. We will integrate machine reading of the cancer literature with probabilistic reasoning across cancer claims using specially designed ontologies, computational modelling of cancer mechanisms (pathways), automated hypothesis generation to extend knowledge of the mechanisms and a 'Robot Scientist' that performs experiments to test the hypotheses. A repetitive cycle of text mining, modelling, experimental testing, and worldview updating is intended to lead to increased knowledge about cancer mechanisms.

=== Pathtext ===
Pathtext/Refine is a system designed to integrate a pathway visualiser, text mining systems and annotation tools.

=== COPIOUS ===
This project aims to produce a knowledge repository of Philippine biodiversity by combining the domain-relevant expertise and resources of Philippine partners with the text mining-based big data analytics of the University of Manchester's National Centre for Text Mining. The repository will be a synergy of different types of information, e.g., taxonomic, occurrence, ecological, biomolecular, biochemical, thus providing users with a comprehensive view on species of interest that will allow them to (1) carry out predictive analysis on species distributions, and (2) investigate potential medicinal applications of natural products derived from Philippine species.

=== Europe PMC Project ===
This is a collaboration with the Text-Mining group at the European Bioinformatics Institute (EBI) and Mimas (data centre), forming a work package in the Europe PubMed Central project (formerly UKPMC) hosted and coordinated by the British Library. Europe PMC, as a whole, forms a European version of the PubMed Central paper repository, in collaboration with the National Institutes of Health (NIH) in the United States. Europe PMC is funded by a consortium of key funding bodies from the biomedical research funders. The contribution to this major project is in the application of text mining solutions to enhance information retrieval and knowledge discovery. As such this is an application of technology developed in other NaCTeM projects on a large scale and in a prominent resource for the Biomedicine community.

=== Mining Biodiversity ===
This project aims to transform the Biodiversity Heritage Library (BHL) into a next-generation social digital library resource to facilitate the study and discussion (via social media integration) of legacy science documents on biodiversity by a worldwide community and to raise awareness of the changes in biodiversity over time in the general public. The project integrates novel text mining methods, visualisation, crowdsourcing and social media into the BHL. The resulting digital resource will provide fully interlinked and indexed access to the full content of BHL library documents, via semantically enhanced and interactive browsing and searching capabilities, allowing users to locate precisely the information of interest to them in an easy and efficient manner.

=== Mining for Public Health ===
This project aims to conduct novel research in text mining and machine learning to transform the way in which evidence-based public health (EBPH) reviews are conducted. The aims of the project include developing unsupervised new text mining methods to derive term similarities, supporting screening during EBPH reviews, and creating new algorithms for ranking and visualising meaningful associations of multiple types in a dynamic and iterative manner. These newly developed methods will be evaluated in EBPH reviews, based on implementation of a pilot, to ascertain the level of transformation in EBPH reviewing.
