= Martin Kay =

British computer scientist (1935–2021)

Martin Kay (1935 – 7 August 2021) was a British computer scientist, known especially for his work in computational linguistics.

Born and raised in the United Kingdom, he received his M.A. from Trinity College, Cambridge, in 1961. In 1958 he started to work at the Cambridge Language Research Unit, one of the earliest centres for research in what is now known as Computational Linguistics. In 1961, he moved to the Rand Corporation in Santa Monica, California, US, where he eventually became head of research in linguistics and machine translation. He left Rand in 1972 to become Chair of the Department of Computer Science at the University of California, Irvine. In 1974, he moved to the Xerox Palo Alto Research Center as a Research Fellow. In 1985, while retaining his position at Xerox PARC, he joined the faculty of Stanford University half-time. He was most recently Professor of Linguistics at Stanford University and Honorary Professor of Computational Linguistics at Saarland University.

== Background ==
Kay was born in Edgware (Middlesex, Great Britain) in 1935, and studied linguistics and computational linguistics at Trinity College in Cambridge.

His main interests were translation, both by people and machines, and computational linguistic algorithms, especially in the fields of morphology and syntax.

Kay died after a long illness on 7 August 2021.

== Work ==
Kay began his career at the Cambridge language Research Unit in Cambridge, England under Margaret Masterman. In 1961 David G. Hays hired him to work for the RAND Corporation; he subsequently worked for the University of California, Irvine and Xerox PARC. Kay is one of the pioneers of computational linguistics and machine translation. He was responsible for introducing the notion of chart parsing in computational linguistics, and the notion of unification in linguistics generally.

With Ronald Kaplan, he pioneered research and application development in finite-state morphology. He has been a longtime contributor to, and critic of, work on machine translation. In his seminal paper "The Proper Place of Men and Machines in Language Translation," Kay argued for MT systems that were tightly integrated in the human translation process. He was reviewer and critic of EUROTRA, Verbmobil, and many other MT projects.

Kay was a former Chair of the Association of Computational Linguistics and President of the International Committee on Computational Linguistics. He was a Research Fellow at Xerox PARC until 2002. He held an honorary doctorate of University of Gothenburg. Kay received the lifetime Achievement Award of the Association for Computational Linguistics for his sustained role as an intellectual leader of NLP research in 2005.

== Achievements and honours ==
- His achievements included the development of chart parsing and functional unification grammar and major contributions to the application of finite state automata in computational phonology and morphology. He was also regarded as a leading authority on machine translation.
- His honours included an honorary Doctor of Philosophy from University of Gothenburg and the 2005 Association for Computational Linguistics' Lifetime Achievement Award. He was the permanent chairman of the International Committee on Computational Linguistics.

== Contributions ==
1. Martin Kay's "proper" paper [1] After the ALPAC report in 1966, the conclusion was made as "There is no immediate or predictable prospect of useful MT producing useful translation of general scientific texts." [2] And because of this result, the field of machine translation entered into a dark period. From 1966 to 1976, almost ten years, few researches were done. However, in 1980s, the Renaissance period was coming. [3] "The Proper Place of Men and Machines in Language Translation" attracted more attention on the machine translation. In this paper, new thoughts were achieved about the relationship between machine translation and human translation. At that time, with the application of cheaper computers and broad usage of domains in machine translation, high quality outputs were badly needed. And the theory of Fully Automatic High Quality Translation was just the ideal level for machine translation after the criticisms by Bar-Hillel in his 1960s review of MT progress: "The goal of MT should not be the fully automatic high quality translation (FAHQT) that can replace human translators. Instead, MT should adopt less ambitious goals, e.g. more cost-effective human-machine interaction and aim at enhancement of human translation productivity." [4] The useful of human translation was promoted to a new higher level. According to this thought, Martin Kay proposed a more practical idea about the relationship between human and machine in the process of machine translation, called "translator's amanuensis".

1.1 Two arguments against the useful of machine translation Because this idea includes the human and machine at the same time, so both computer scientists and linguists have responsibilities to the MT. But "they should never be asked to provide an engineering solution to a problem that they only dimly understand." They just need to achieve "by doing only what can be done with absolute surety and reliability …can be virtually guaranteed to all concerned." As the main parts of the translation, there are two related arguments against the plausibility of machine translation as an industrial enterprise from the point of view of linguistics and computer science. Two arguments are commonly made for ad hoc solutions to the problems of machine translation. In the former argument, "Ad hoc solutions tend to be based on case-by-case analyses of what linguists call surface phenomena, essentially strings of words, and on real or imagined statistical properties of particular styles of writing and domains of discourse." It is a simple statistical claim that can be dismissed. In the second argument, ad hoc solutions is only alluded to the understanding of the second language by reading text, and was called sorcerer's apprentice, because "this kind of argument is to the effect that the kind of incomplete theory that linguists and computer scientists have been able to provide is often a worse base on which to build practical devices than no theory at all because the theory does not know when to stop." "The main problem with the sorcerer's-apprentice argument is that the decision that a sentence could be translated without analysis can only be made after the fact. Example sentence shows that there is more than one interpretation of a sentence at some level and further analysis shows that there is a single translation that is compatible with each of them. In short, the algorithm required to decide when analysis is required would have to use the results of the very analysis it is designed to avoid."

1.2 The Translator's Amanuensis and translation memory This is the main part of the paper, for illustrate what is translator's amanuensis, the author showed three aspects: text editing, translation aids, and machine translation. "Suppose that the translators are provided with a terminal consisting of a keyboard, a screen, and some way of pointing at individual words and letters. The display on the screen is divided into two windows. The text to be translated appears in the upper window and the translation will be composed in the bottom one." It is the form of the translator's amanuensis which is not a real device and never will. "Both windows behave in the same way. Using the pointing device, the translator can select a letter, word, sentence, line, or paragraph and, by pressing the appropriate key, cause some operation to be visited upon it."

These two figures show the translation process from the initial display to selection. This device is not simple as these two figures, more special service can be made to translator by it. In the translation aids, the author showed the third figure:

"A relatively trivial addition would be a dictionary. The translator selects a word or sequence of words and gives a command to cause them to be looked up…This new window gives the effect of overlaying some portion of the windows already present. In this case, the new window contains a deceptively simple dictionary entry for the selected word." What's more, the device has many other features. For example, the simplicity of the dictionary entry, words Syntax and Semantics will be included when pointing to symbols, modifiable dictionary entries and the temporary amendments make this device more practical. Then, machine translation be explained. "One of the options that should be offered to a user of the hypothetical system I have been describing, at a fairly early stage, be a command that will direct the program to translate the currently selected unit. What will happen when this command is given will be different at different stages of the system's development. But a user of the system will always be empowered to intervene in the translation process to the extent that he himself specifies. If he elects not to intervene at all, a piece of text purporting to translate the current unit will be displayed in the lower window of his screen. He will be able to edit this in any way he likes, just as post-editors have done in the past. Alternatively, he may ask to be consulted whenever the program is confronted with a decision of a specified type, when certain kinds of ambiguities are detected, or whatever. On these occasions, the system will put a question to the human translator. He may, for example, ask to be consulted on questions of pronominal reference." In this part, idea of translation memory was shown as a dictionary operation. "Suppose, for example, that a word is put in the local store – that part of the dictionary that persists only as long as this document is being worked on – if it occurs in the text significantly more frequently than statistics stored in the main dictionary indicate. A phrase will be noted if it occurs two or three times but is not recognized as an idiom or set phrase by the dictionary. By examining the contents of this store before embarking on the translation, a user may hope to get a preview of the difficulties ahead and to make some decisions in advance about how to treat them. These decisions, of course, will be recorded in the store itself. In the course of doing this or, indeed, for any reason whatever, the translator can call for a display of all the units in the text that contain a certain word, phrase, string of characters, or whatever. After all, the most important reference to have when translating a text is the text itself. If the piece of text to be translated next is anything but entirely straightforward, the translator might start by issuing a command causing the system to display anything in the store that might be relevant to it. This will bring to his attention decisions he made before the actual translation started, statistically significant words and phrases, and a record of anything that had attracted attention when it occurred before. Before going on, he can examine past and future fragments of text that contain similar material."

1.3 Expectation of the better performance of the translator's amanuensis At the end of the paper, Kay mentioned some reasons to expect better performance of this device. First, the system is in a position to draw its human collaborator's attention to the matters most likely to need it, second, the decisions that have to be made in the course of translating a passage are rarely independent, third, one of the most important facilities in the system is the one that keeps track of words and phrases that are used in some special way in the current text.

- «A Life in Language». A speech given in acknowledgement of the Lifetime Achievement Award at the 43rd Annual Meeting of the Association for Computational Linguistics, Ann Arbor, Michigan, 27 June 2005. http://www.stanford.edu/~mjkay/LifeOfLanguage.pdf
- String Alignment Using Suffix Trees. A paper about the possible use of suffix trees for aligning texts and their translations. http://www.stanford.edu/~mjkay/CYCLING.pdf
- Some unfinished musings on the nature of translation. Here are some unfinished musings on the nature of translation. http://www.stanford.edu/~mjkay/CurrentState.pdf
- Some half-baked thoughts on language models in statistical NLP on which I need some help. http://www.stanford.edu/~mjkay/language_models.pdf
- His 1994 paper on "Regular Models of Phonological Rule Systems". Computational Linguistics 20(3):331–378" with Ronald Kaplan. http://www.stanford.edu/~mjkay/Kaplan%26Kay.pdf

== Books ==
- Linguistics and Information Science (with Karen Spärck Jones), Academic Press, 1973.
- Natural Language in Information Science (edited with D. E. Walker and Hans Karlgren), Skriptor, Stockholm, 1977
- Verbmobil: A Translation System for Face-to-Face Dialog (with Jean Mark Gawron and Peter Norvig), CSLI, Stanford, California, 1994.
- An Introduction to Machine Translation. W. John Hutchins and Harold L. Somers. London: Academic Press, 1992.
- Handbook of Computational Linguistics. Ruslan Mitkov (ed.). Oxford University Press, 2003. (Introduction.)

== Selected papers ==
- "Rules of Interpretation—An Approach to the Problem of Computation in the Semantics of Natural Language", in Proceedings of the Second International Congress of the International Federation for Information Processing, 1962.
- "A Parsing Procedure" Proceedings of the Second International Congress of the International Federation for Information Processing, 1962.
- "A General Procedure for Rewriting Strings", paper presented at the annual meeting of the Association for Machine Translation and Computational Linguistics, Bloomington, Indiana, 1964.
- The Logic of Cognate Recognition in Historical Linguistics, RM-4224-PR, Santa Monica, The RAND Corporation, July 1964.
- A Parsing Program for Categorial Grammars, RM-4283-PR, Santa Monica, The RAND Corporation, August 1964.
- The Tabular Parser: A Parsing Program for Phrase-Structure and Dependency, RM-4933-PR, Santa Monica, The RAND Corporation, July 1966.
- The Computer System to Aid the Linguistic Field Worker, P-4095, Santa Monica, The RAND Corporation, May 1969.
- The MIND System: The Morphological Analysis Program, RM-6265/2-PR, Santa Monica, The RAND Corporation, April 1970. (with Gary R. Martins).
- "Automatic Translation of Natural Languages" in Language as a Human Problem: Daedalus, 1973.
- "Functional Unification Grammar: A Formalism for Machine Translation" in Proceedings of the International Conference on Computational Linguistics (COLING 84), The Association for Computational Linguistics, 1984.
- "Parsing in Free Word Order Languages" (with Lauri Karttunen), in Dowty, David R., Lauri Karttunen, and Arnold M. Zwicky, Natural Language Parsing, Cambridge University Press, 1985.
- "Unification in Grammar", in Dahl, V., and P. Saint-Dizier, Natural Language Understanding and Logic Programming, North Holland, 1985.
- "Theoretical Issues in the Design of a Translator's Work Station", Proceedings of the IBM workshop on Computers and Translation, Copenhagen.
- "Regular Models of Phonological Rule Systems" (with R. M. Kaplan), Computational Linguistics 20:3 (September 1994. With R. M. Kaplan).
- "Substring Alignment Using Suffix Trees". Computational Linguistics and Intelligent Text Processing, Springer, Lecture Notes in Computer Science, 2004.

== Course readings ==
- Disjunctive Unification http://www.stanford.edu/~mjkay/DisjunctiveUnification.pdf
- Functional Uncertainty http://www.stanford.edu/~mjkay/FunctionalUncertainty.pdf
- HPSG1 http://www.stanford.edu/~mjkay/pollard-foundations.pdf
- HPSG2 http://www.stanford.edu/~mjkay/levine03.pdf
- HPSG Generation http://www.stanford.edu/~mjkay/Shieber.pdf
- CCG http://www.stanford.edu/~mjkay/Steedman%26Baldridge.pdf
- Typed Features http://www.stanford.edu/~mjkay/Copestake.pdf
- Dependency http://www.stanford.edu/~mjkay/covington.pdf

== Awards ==
- He had an honorary professorship at the University of the Saarland and honorary doctorates from the universities of Gothenburg and Geneva.
- He also won the 2005 ACL Lifetime Achievement Award. His acceptance speech was entitled "A Life of Language".

Preceded by Karen Spärck Jones	ACL Lifetime Achievement Award; 2005	Succeeded by Eva Hajičová
