= University of Ss. Cyril and Methodius =

University in Slovakia

Coordinates: 48.383°N 17.589°E

University of Ss. Cyril and Methodius in Trnava
- Univerzita sv. Cyrila a Metoda v Trnave
- Type: Public
- Established: 1 August 1997; 29 years ago
- Affiliations: Erasmus
- Rector: prof. Mgr. Katarína Slobodová Nováková, PhD.
- Students: 5 344 (31.10.2018)
- Location: Námestie J. Herdu 2; 917 01 Trnava, Slovakia
- Patron: Saints Cyril and Methodius
- Nickname: UCM
- Website: ucm.sk

University of Ss. Cyril and Methodius in Trnava (Slovak: Univerzita sv. Cyrila a Metoda v Trnave) is a public university located in Trnava, Slovakia. Established by Law No. 201/1997 Z.z. from 27 June 1997. Since 2022, Katarína Slobodová Nováková has been the rector of the university.

Not to be confused with University of Trnava.

== Faculties ==
University of Ss. Cyril and Methodius in Trnava has five faculties:

- Faculty of Arts
- Faculty of Mass Media Communication
- Faculty of Natural Science
- Faculty of Social Science
- Institute of Physiotherapy, Balneology and Medical Rehabilitation (in Piešťany)

== Rector ==
The Academic Senate of the University of Ss. Cyril and Methodius in Trnava on 13 March 2018 elected a new rector of the university, Roman Boča.
