= Pierre Isabelle =

Canadian academic

Pierre Isabelle is a Canadian scientist and linguist. Isabelle was the principal scientist and group leader of the Interactive Language Technologies group at the National Research Council Canada (NRC-CNRC). Isabelle is now retired.

== Education ==
Isabelle holds a Ph.D. in computational linguistics from the Université de Montréal. He started his research career in 1975 as a member of the TAUM machine translation group at the Université de Montréal.

== Career ==
Between 1985 and 1996, he was in charge of the machine-aided translation team of CITI, a research laboratory of the Canadian Department of Industry. In 1997 he returned to the Université de Montréal as head of the RALI (Recherche appliquée en linguistique informatique) laboratory of the computer science department. In 1999 he joined the Xerox Research Centre Europe (XRCE) in Grenoble, France, where he managed the Content Analysis area until he joined the NRC in 2005.

Isabelle is known for his position on "bi-textuality" or bitexts, and is widely quoted for saying that existing translations contain more solutions to more translation problems than any other available resource.

In 2006, Isabelle became president of the Centre de recherche de technologies langagières (CRTL) in Gatineau, which developed language technologies in partnership with Canadian institutions and industry.

In 2012, he published an article in The Society of Translators of Quebec, titled "La traduction machine: règles, statistiques et apprentissage machine" which discussed automatic translations like Google Translate and Language Weaver and machine learning.

== Publications ==
- https://nrc-publications.canada.ca/eng/view/accepted/?id=95820308-d465-47bb-9587-2c3cde094ef1
- https://nrc-publications.canada.ca/fra/voir/td/?id=c56f83ba-76e7-4660-8a6f-89f069ee2c44
- https://publications-cnrc.canada.ca/fra/voir/objet/?id=eb20ab93-0310-442a-ac5f-867bc2b64745
