= Juha Pentikäinen =

Finnish university professor

Juha Pentikäinen (born 26 February 1940) is a professor emeritus of the Department of Religious Studies at the University of Helsinki and a professor of northern ethnography at the University of Lapland and the Institute for Northern Culture in Helsinki. With a fieldwork oriented approach to the study of religious traditions, he is especially interested in the oral history of languages, religions and cultures.

== Research ==
He has research interests in religious traditions in the Finnish culture, and their psychological effects on humans. Along with many guest professorships, he has appeared to speak at over 100 Universities in numerous different countries. Based upon his work, other professors (i.e. Veikko Anttonen and Nils G. Holm) in his field have analyzed his approach towards the studies of religion.

== Recognition and publications ==
He is recipient of many awards and honors including the 3rd honorary medal of the international society for research for the lifetime career as the scholar of shamanism in 1999. His publications since 1960 include 30 books, 250 scholarly articles, and 15 films. In 1995 he was nominated to membership of the Finnish Academy of Science and Letters. He is most known for his book Kalevala Mythology, which is an in-depth analysis of Elias Lönnrot's epic Kalevala. He analyzes both the career background and life of Lönnrot. Then he analyzes the epic, and the differences between the two versions that Lönnrot wrote. He reveals the flaws within the epic and presents the argument that the epic instilled a spirit of national romanticism within the Finnish society, which makes it so significant to the Finnish culture.

== Personal life ==
His father Veikko Pentikäinen (1909–1992) was an influential Laestadian Lutheran priest. His uncle Vilho Pentikäinen (b. 1903), a lieutenant serving as a photographer for the General Staff of the Finnish army, was discovered in 1933 spying for the Soviet Union. The uncle fled to the Soviets, and later served as a Soviet officer in Spain during the Spanish Civil War and in Leningrad and Estonia during the Winter War. Responding to an inquiry by Juha Pentikäinen in 2007, the Russian intelligence service FSB stated that his uncle had died of starvation in a prison camp in March 1942, convicted of spying for Finland; however, some researchers believe he continued to serve in Soviet military intelligence and died in 1967.

== Publications ==
- The Nordic Dead-Child Tradition: Nordic Dead-Child Beings — A Study in Comparative Religion. Translated by Antony Landon. FF Communications 202. Helsinki: Suomalainen Tiedeakatemia, 1968.
- Oral Repertoire and World View. An Anthropological Study of Marina Takalo’s Life History. FF Communications 219. Helsinki: Suomalainen Tiedeakatemia, 1978. ISBN 9789514103209.
- Kalevalan mytologia [Kalevala Mythology]. Helsinki: Gaudeamus, 1987. ISBN 951-662-403-0.
- Kalevala Mythology. Folklore Studies in Translation. Edited and translated by Ritva Poom. Bloomington, IN: Indiana University Press, 1989 (first edition), 1999 (expanded edition). ISBN 978-0253213525.
- Shamanism and Culture. Helsinki: Etnika, 1998. ISBN 9519788905.
- Golden King of the Forest: The Lore of the Northern Bear. Edited and translated by Clive Tolley. Helsinki: Etnika, 2007. ISBN 978-9519788975.

=== As editor ===
- Uralic Mythology and Folklore. With Mihály Hoppál. Ethnologica Uralica 1. Budapest: Ethnographic Institute of the Hungarian Academy of Sciences; Helsinki: Finnish Literature Society, 1989. ISBN 9789517175517.
- Northern Religions and Shamanism. With Mihály Hoppál. Ethnologica Uralica 69. Budapest: Akadémiai Kiadó; Helsinki: Finnish Literature Society, 1992. ISBN 9789517177238
- Shamanism and Northern Ecology. New York: De Gruyter, 1998. ISBN 3-11-014186-8.
- Sami Folkloristics. NNF Publications 6. Turku: Nordic Network of Folklore, 2000. ISBN 9789521206283.
- The Finnish Sauna, the Japanese Guro, the Indian Inipi: Bathing on Three Continents. Helsinki: Rakennustieto, 2001. ISBN 9789516825901.
- Shamanhood: Symbolism and Epic. In collaboration with Hanna Saressalo and Chuner M. Taksami. Religion and Society 36. Budapest: Akademiai Kiado, 2001. ISBN 9789630578110
- Shamanhood: An Endangered Language. With Peter Simoncsics. Oslo: Novus Forlag, 2005. ISBN 82-7099-391-3.
