= Jun'ichi Tsujii =

Japanese computer scientist

Professor Jun'ichi Tsujii
- Born: 7 February 1949 (age 77)
- Education: Kyoto University
- Awards: Purple Ribbon Medals of Honor (Japan); FUNAI Achievement Award; ACL fellow
- Scientific career
- Fields: Natural language processing
- Workplaces: University of Tokyo; University of Manchester; National Centre for Text Mining; Microsoft Research Asia; National Institute of Advanced Industrial Science and Technology
- Doctoral advisor: Makoto Nagao
- Website: unit.aist.go.jp/airc/en/intro/index.html

Jun'ichi Tsujii (辻井 潤一, Tsujii Jun'ichi; born 7 February 1949) is a Japanese computer scientist specializing in natural language processing and text mining, particularly in the field of biology and bioinformatics.

== Education ==
Tsujii received his Bachelor of Engineering, Master of Engineering and PhD degrees in electrical engineering from Kyoto University in 1971, 1973, and 1978 respectively. He was Assistant Professor and Associate Professor at Kyoto University, before accepting a position as Professor of Computational Linguistics at the University of Manchester Institute of Science and Technology (UMIST) in 1988. He was President of the Association for Computational Linguistics (ACL) in 2006, and has been a permanent member of the International Committee on Computational Linguistics (ICCL) since 1992, and the chair of the committee since 2014.

== Research ==
Since May 2015, Tsujii has been the director of the Artificial Intelligence Research Center at the National Institute of Advanced Industrial Science and Technology, Japan. Tsujii was previously a Principal Researcher at Microsoft Research Asia (MSRA). Before joining MSRA, he was a professor at the University of Tokyo, where he belonged to both the School of Inter-faculty Initiative on Informatics and the Graduate School of Information Science and Technology. Tsujii is also a Visiting Professor and Scientific Advisor at the National Centre for Text Mining (NaCTeM) at the University of Manchester in the United Kingdom.

== Awards ==
On 14 May 2010, Tsujii was awarded the Medals of Honor with Purple Ribbon, one of Japan's highest awards, presented to influential contributors in the fields of art, academics or sports.

In September 2014, Tsujii was awarded the FUNAI Achievement Award at the Forum on Information Technology (FIT), which took place at the University of Tsukuba. The award is presented to distinguished individuals engaged in research or related business activities in the field of Information Technology who have produced excellent achievements in the field, are still active in leading positions and have strong impact on young students and researchers.

In December 2014, Tsujii was named as an ACL Fellow, in recognition of his significant contributions to MT, parsing by unification-based grammar and text mining for biology.

In March 2016, Tsujii was awarded Okawa Prize for his contribution to the field of Natural Language Processing, Machine Translation and Text Mining, together with Professor Jaime Carbonnel of CMU.

In August 2021, Tsujii received ACL Lifetime Achievement Award, which is considered the most prestigious award in the field of Computational Linguistics and Natural Language Processing.

In May 2022, Tsujii received the Order of the Sacred Treasure, Gold Rays and Neck Ribbon, from the Japanese government.

In October 2024, Tsujii was designated a Person of Cultural Merit.

== Selected publications ==
- Oiwa, Hidekazu; Tsujii, Jun'ichi (2014). Common Space Embedding of Primal-Dual Relation Semantic Spaces. COLING 2014. Dublin. pp. 1579–1590.
- Taura, K.; Matsuzaki, T.; Miwa, M.; Kamoshida, Y.; Yokoyama, D.; Dun, N.; Shibata, T.; Jun, C. S.; Tsujii, J. (2013). "Design and implementation of GXP make – A workflow system based on make". Future Generation Computer Systems. 29 (2): 662–672. doi:10.1016/j.future.2011.05.026. S2CID 31627886.
- Sun, X.; Zhang, Y.; Matsuzaki, T.; Tsuruoka, Y.; Tsujii, J. (2013). "Probabilistic Chinese word segmentation with non-local information and stochastic training". Information Processing & Management. 49 (3): 626–636. doi:10.1016/j.ipm.2012.12.003.
- Mu, T.; Goulermas, J. Y.; Tsujii, J.; Ananiadou, S. (2012). "Proximity-Based Frameworks for Generating Embeddings from Multi-Output Data". IEEE Transactions on Pattern Analysis and Machine Intelligence. 34 (11): 2216–2232. Bibcode:2012ITPAM..34.2216M. doi:10.1109/TPAMI.2012.20. PMID 23289130. S2CID 711467.
- Miwa, M.; Sætre, R.; Kim, J. D.; Tsujii, J. (2010). "Event Extraction with Complex Event Classification Using Rich Features". Journal of Bioinformatics and Computational Biology. 08 (1): 131–146. doi:10.1142/S0219720010004586. PMID 20183879.
- Kim, J. D.; Ohta, T.; Tsujii, J. (2008). "Corpus annotation for mining biomedical events from literature". BMC Bioinformatics. 9 10. doi:10.1186/1471-2105-9-10. PMC 2267702. PMID 18182099.
- Miyao, Y.; Tsujii, J. (2008). "Feature Forest Models for Probabilistic HPSG Parsing". Computational Linguistics. 34: 35–80. doi:10.1162/coli.2008.34.1.35. S2CID 885002.
- Sagae, Kenji; Tsujii, Jun'ichi (2007). Dependency Parsing and Domain Adaptation with LR Models and Parser Ensembles. EMNLP-CoNLL. pp. 1044–1050.
- Ananiadou, S; Pyysalo, S; Tsujii, J; Kell, D. B. (2010). "Event extraction for systems biology by text mining the literature". Trends in Biotechnology. 28 (7): 381–90. doi:10.1016/j.tibtech.2010.04.005. PMID 20570001.
- Tsuruoka, Y.; Tateishi, Y.; Kim, J. D.; Ohta, T.; McNaught, J.; Ananiadou, S.; Tsujii, J. (2005). "Developing a Robust Part-of-Speech Tagger for Biomedical Text". Advances in Informatics. Lecture Notes in Computer Science. Vol. 3746. p. 382. doi:10.1007/11573036_36. ISBN 978-3-540-29673-7. S2CID 206592413.
- Tsuruoka, Y.; Tsujii, J. (2005). Bidirectional inference with the easiest-first strategy for tagging sequence data. Proceedings of the conference on Human Language Technology and Empirical Methods in Natural Language Processing - HLT '05. pp. 467–474. doi:10.3115/1220575.1220634.
- Tsujii, J.; Ananiadou, S. (2005). "Thesaurus or Logical Ontology, Which One Do We Need for Text Mining?". Language Resources and Evaluation. 39: 77–90. doi:10.1007/s10579-005-2697-0. S2CID 3204827.
- Kazama, J. I.; Tsujii, J. I. (2005). "Maximum Entropy Models with Inequality Constraints: A Case Study on Text Categorization". Machine Learning. 60 (1–3): 159–194. doi:10.1007/s10994-005-0911-3. hdl:10119/3305.
- Matsuzaki, T.; Miyao, Y.; Tsujii, J. I. (2005). Probabilistic CFG with latent annotations. 43rd Annual Meeting on Association for Computational Linguistics - ACL '05. p. 75. doi:10.3115/1219840.1219850.
- Kim, J. -D.; Ohta, T.; Tateisi, Y.; Tsujii, J. (2003). "GENIA corpus--a semantically annotated corpus for bio-textmining". Bioinformatics. 19: i180–i182. doi:10.1093/bioinformatics/btg1023. PMID 12855455.
- Hirschman, L.; Park, J. C.; Tsujii, J.; Wong, L.; Wu, C. H. (2002). "Accomplishments and challenges in literature data mining for biology". Bioinformatics. 18 (12): 1553–1561. doi:10.1093/bioinformatics/18.12.1553. PMID 12490438.
- Torisawa, K.; Tsujii, J. I. (1996). Computing phrasal-signs in HPSG prior to parsing. 16th conference on Computational linguistics -. Vol. 2. p. 949. doi:10.3115/993268.993332.
