= David G. Hays =

David Glenn Hays (November 17, 1928 – July 26, 1995) was a linguist, computer scientist and social scientist best known for his early work in machine translation and computational linguistics.

== Career overview ==
David Hays graduated from Harvard College in 1951 and received his Ph.D. in 1956 from Harvard's Department of Social Relations. In 1954-1955 he held a fellowship at the Center for Advanced Studies in the Behavioral Sciences at Stanford and took a job at the RAND Corporation, Santa Monica in 1955, where he remained though 1968. In 1969 he joined the faculty of the State University of New York at Buffalo where he was founding chairman of the newly formed linguistics department and Professor of Linguistics, of Computer Science, and of Information and Library Studies. He remained at Buffalo until 1980 when he retired from the university and moved to New York City, where he worked as a private consultant and pursued independent research in cultural evolution and the arts, especially the ballet. He was on the editorial board of the Journal of Social and Evolutionary Systems and starting in 1989 was a member of Connected Education's online faculty for their MA in Media Studies offered through The New School.

== Language and computation ==
During his years at RAND he worked on the machine translation of Russian technical literature into English and more generally on computational linguistics, a term that he created. The syntactic component of the RAND system was based on Lucien Tesnière's dependency grammar and Hays became its principal advocate in America. More than anyone else Hays is responsible for the realization that language processing should consist in the application of theoretically motivated grammars to specific texts by general algorithms. In 1967 Hays published the first textbook in computational linguistics, Introduction to Computational Linguistics. At his direction RAND assembled an annotated corpus of a million words of Russian text, and thus pioneered in what is now known as corpus linguistics.

== Culture and cognition ==
After leaving RAND and assuming his position at Buffalo, Hays turned to more a more general interest in language and cognition and, ultimately, the evolution of human culture. He developed an approach to abstract concepts in which their meaning was grounded in stories. Hays elaborated this idea in a series of articles and several of his graduate students, including Brian Phillips, Mary White, and William Benzon, employed the idea in their work. In 1982 he published Cognitive Structures, in which he developed a novel scheme for grounding cognition in perception and action as conceived in the control theory of William T. Powers. Working with William Benzon, he published a neural interpretation of this theory in 1988. During the 1980s and early 1990s he and Benzon developed a theory of cultural rank which they published in a series of papers (together and individually) and a book on the history of technology (Hays alone) in the early 1990s. His last major work was a critical review and synthesis of the empirical work that anthropologists and archaeologists had done on cultural complexity. This book was published posthumously as The Measurement of Cultural Evolution in the Non-Literate World: Homage to Raoul Naroll. At the time of his death, he had embarked on a study of the ballet, looking to understand how motion generates emotion.

== Professional service ==
Hays played an important role in the professional organization of computational linguistics. He advocated the organization of the Association for Computational Linguistics and served as its second president in 1964. He was the first editor of its journal, Computational Linguistics (then called the American Journal of Computational Linguistics) from 1974 to 1978; the journal was originally published on microfiche to facilitate rapid publication and allow for longer articles than is practical in hard-copy publication. He was one of the founders of the International Committee on Computational Linguistics, served as its chairman from 1965 to 1969 and was an honorary member from 1965 to 1995.

== Publications ==
Books, a selection of

- Introduction to Computational Linguistics, American Elsevier, New York, 1967 B00005W7K5
- Cognitive Structures, HRAF Press, New Haven, 1982 9991740309
- The Evolution of Technology, Preliminary Edition. Diskette-book, Connected Editions, New York, 1991, available online.
- The Measurement of Cultural Evolution in the Non-Literate World: Homage to Raoul Naroll. Metagram Press, New York, 1994 0966725506

Articles, a selection of

- (With Robert R. Bush) A study of group action. American Sociological Review, 19:693-701, 1954. Reprinted in Readings in Mathematical Psychology, edited by R. Duncan Luce, Robert R. Bush, and Eugene Galanter. Wiley, 1965, 2:242-253
- Order of subject and object in scientific Russian when other differentia are lacking. Mechanical Translation, 5:111-113, 1958
- Dependency theory: A formalism and some observations. Language, 40: 511–525, 1964. Reprinted in Syntactic Theory 1, Structuralist, edited by Fred W. Householder. Penguin, 1972
- A billion books for education in America and the world: A proposal ([Rand Corporation] Memorandum RM-5574-RC) (Unknown Binding) 1968
- (With Enid Margolis, Raoul Naroll, and Revere Dale Perkins) Color term salience. American Anthropologist, 74:1107-1121, 1972
- Cognitive networks and abstract terminology. Journal of Clinical Computing, 3(2):110-118, 1973
- On 'alienation': An essay in the psycholinguistics of science. In Theories of Alienation, edited by R. Felix Geyer and David R. Schweitzer. Martinus Nijhoff, 1976, 169–187
- Machine translation and abstract terminology. In Studies in Descriptive and Historical Linguistics, edited by Paul J. Hopper. John Benjamins, 1977, 95–108
- (With David Bloom) Designation in English. In Anaphora in Discourse, edited by John V. Hinds. Champaign, Ill., Linguistic Research 1978: 1–68
- (With William L. Benzon) Principles and Development of Natural Intelligence. Journal of Social and Biological Structures 11:1-30, 1988
- (With William L. Benzon) The Evolution of Cognition. Journal of Social and Biological Structures 13:297-320, 1990
- The Evolution of Expressive Culture. Journal of Social and Evolutionary Systems 15: 187–215, 1992
- Relativism and Progress. Journal of Social and Evolutionary Systems 18:9-32, 1995
