= Ján Horecký (linguist) =

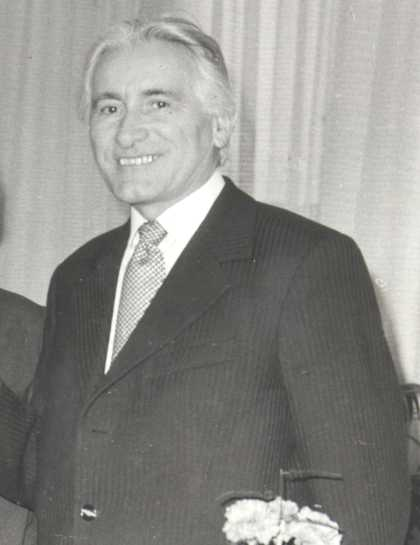
- Born: 8 January 1920; Stupava, Czechoslovakia (now Slovakia)
- Died: 11 August 2006 (aged 86); Stupava, Slovakia
- Citizenship: Slovakia
- Education: Comenius University
- Awards: Scientist of the Year (Slovak Academy of Sciences); Pribina Cross 1st class, Honorary doctorate of the University of Prešov, Honorary doctorate of the University of Ss. Cyril and Methodius
- Scientific career
- Fields: Linguistics
- Workplaces: Slovak Academy of Sciences

Ján Horecký (8 January 1920 - 11 August 2006) was a Slovak linguist.

In 1944 he graduated in Slovak and Latin language at the Slovak University in Bratislava (now Comenius University). After graduation, Horecký became a researcher at the Slovak Academy of Sciences.

In addition to study of the Slovak language, he also studied Czech, Hungarian, Latin, Ancient Greek and various constructed languages. He was particularly interested in the Romani language, a topic he collaborated on with his daughter, the Indologist Anna Rácová.

== Publications ==
- Horecký, Ján: Základy slovenskej terminológie. Bratislava: SAV, 1956.
- Horecký, Ján: Základy jazykovedy. Bratislava: Slovenské pedagogické nakladateľstvo, 1978.
- Ondrus, Pavol – Horecký, Ján – Furdík, Juraj: Súčasný slovenský spisovný jazyk: Lexikológia. Bratislava: Slovenské pedagogické nakladateľstvo, 1980.
- Horecký, Ján: Spoločnosť a jazyk. Bratislava: Veda, 1982.
- Horecký, Ján: Slovenčina v našom živote. Bratislava: Slovenské pedagogické nakladateľstvo, 1988.
- Rácová, Anna – Horecký, Ján: Slovenská karpatská rómčina, Veda, vydavateľstvo SAV, 2000.

== Awards ==
- 2000: Scientist of the Year, awarded by the Slovak Academy of Sciences
- 2001: Pribina Cross, 1st class for contribution to Slovak science at culture, awarded by the President of Slovakia Rudolf Schuster
- Honorary doctorates from the University of Prešov and University of Ss. Cyril and Methodius
