= Information Processing Society of Japan =

- Formation: April 22, 1960
- Headquarters: Tokyo
- Members: 16,944 regular members 2,446 student members 246 corporate members (as of end of March, 2012)
- President: Norishige Morimoto
- Website: www.ipsj.or.jp

The IPSJ - Information Processing Society of Japan (Japanese: 情報処理学会) is a Japanese learned society for computing. Founded in 1960, it is headquartered in Tokyo, Japan. IPSJ publishes a magazine and several professional journals mainly in Japanese, and sponsors conferences and workshops, also mainly conducted in Japanese. It has nearly 20,000 members. IPSJ is a full member of the International Federation for Information Processing.

== Publications ==
IPSJ publishes one magazine, several journals, and several peer-reviewed transactions. Most of these publications primarily carry articles and peer-reviewed papers in Japanese, but accept some articles in English, especially for transactions special issues.

- Joho Shori magazine
- Journal of Information Processing
- Journal of Digital Practice
- Transactions on:
  - Programming (PRO)
  - Database (TOD)
  - Consumer Device & System (CDS)
  - Bioinformatics (TBIO) (English only)
  - Computer Vision and Applications (CVA) (English only)
  - Mathematical Modeling and its Applications (TOM)
  - Advanced Computing Systems (ACS)
  - Digital Contents (DCON)
  - System Design LSI Methodology (T-SDLM) (English only)
- IPSJ Online Transactions (open access republishing of English-language papers previously published in primarily-Japanese transactions)

== Fellows ==
Every year since 1999, IPSJ has inducted a new group of Japanese Fellows. It has no foreign or international fellows and most, if not all, fellows are Japanese.

== Online Computer Museum ==
IPSJ maintains an online Computer Museum of computers developed in Japan, featuring equipment ranging from old mechanical calculators to modern supercomputers, in both English and Japanese.
