= Ronald Kaplan =

American computer scientist (born 1946)

Ronald M. Kaplan (born 1946) has served as a vice president at Amazon.com and chief scientist for Amazon Search (A9.com). He was previously vice president and distinguished scientist at Nuance Communications and director of Nuance' Natural Language and Artificial Intelligence Laboratory. Prior to that he served as chief scientist and a principal researcher at the Powerset division of Microsoft Bing. He is also an adjunct professor in the Linguistics Department at Stanford University and a principal of Stanford's Center for the Study of Language and Information (CSLI). He was previously a research fellow at the Palo Alto Research Center (formerly the Xerox Palo Alto Research Center), where he was the manager of research in Natural Language Theory and Technology.

He received his bachelor's degree (1968) in mathematics and language behavior from the University of California, Berkeley and his master's (1970) and Ph.D. (1975) in social psychology from Harvard University. As a graduate student he investigated how explicit computational models of grammar, particularly Augmented Transition Networks, could be embedded in models of human language performance, and he wrote the grammar for the LUNAR system, the first large-scale ATN grammar of English. He also developed the notions of consumer-producer and active-chart parsing. He designed (in collaboration with Joan Bresnan) the formal theory of Lexical Functional Grammar and produced its initial computational implementation. He developed (with Martin Kay) the mathematical, linguistic, and computational concepts that underlie the use of finite-state phonological and morphological descriptions.

He helped to embed finite-state methods in a wide range of commercial products offered by Xerox and by several Xerox spin-off companies: Microlytics, Inxight, and Scansoft. In the 1980s he served as chief scientist of Microlytics. He holds 36 patents for inventions in the language technology field.

He was honored with the 2019 Lifetime Achievement Award from the Association for Computational Linguistics (ACL). He is a past President (1979) and an inaugural Fellow (2011) of the ACL, a co-recipient of the 1992 ACM Software Systems Award for his contribution to the Interlisp programming system, and a Fellow of the Association for Computing Machinery. He is also a Fellow of the Cognitive Science Society. During 1995–1996 he was a Fellow-in-Residence at the Netherlands Institute for Advanced Study in the Humanities and Social Sciences. In 2006, he was honored with a festschrift titled Intelligent linguistic architectures: variations on themes by Ronald M. Kaplan, published by CSLI Publications. He was awarded honorary doctorates from Copenhagen University in 2013 and from the University of York in 2019.
