= Comparison of machine translation applications =

Machine translation is an algorithm which attempts to translate text or speech from one natural language to another.

== General information ==
Basic general information for popular machine translation applications.

Name	Platform	License	Price	Latest stable release	Source availability	Number of supported languages	Notes
Anusaaraka	Unix compatible	GNU GPL	No fee required	0.50	Yes		Rule-based, deep parser based, paninian framework based; all programs and language data are free and open-source
Apertium	Cross-platform (web application), Unix compatible, precompiled packages available for Debian	GNU GPL	No fee required	3.9.4	Yes		Rule-based, shallow transfer; all programs and language data are free and open source
Babylon	Windows, Mac	Proprietary	Depends on license ($9.90–$89 for one license)	11.0.1.6	No		Prompts to install the Babylon Toolbar, a browser hijacker which is difficult to remove.
Baidu Fanyi	Cross-platform (web application)	SaaS	No fee required		No	200+	Neural machine translation
DeepL	Cross-platform (web application)	SaaS	No fee required, paid "Pro" version available		No	120+	Neural machine translation
Google Translate	Cross-platform (web application)	SaaS	No fee required		No	240+	Statistical and neural machine translation
GramTrans	Cross-platform (web application)	Free	No fee required	?	No		Rule-based, using constraint grammar
IBM Watson	Cross-platform	SaaS	Free, commercial (varies by plan)	3.0	No	55+	Both rule-based and statistical models developed by IBM Research. Neural machine translation models available through the Watson Language Translator API for developers.
Microsoft Translator	Cross-platform (web application)	SaaS	No fee required		No	180+	Statistical and neural machine translation
Moses	Cross-platform	GNU LGPL	No fee required	4.0	Yes		Drop-in replacement for Pharaoh, features factored translation models and decoding of confusion networks.
Moses for Mere Mortals	Ubuntu Linux	GNU GPL	No fee required	2014-11-16	Yes		Free open source; based on Moses; translation memories integration.
Naver Papago	Cross-platform (web application)	SaaS	No fee required		No	15+	
NiuTrans	Cross-platform	GNU GPL	No fee required	1.4.0	Yes	450+	Competitive performance for Chinese translation tasks; statistical machine translation. Supports phrase-based, hierarchical phrase-based, and syntax-based (string-to-tree, tree-to-string, and tree-to-tree) models for research purposes.
OpenLogos	Windows, Linux	GNU GPL or paid initiative taker	No fee required	1.0.3	Yes		Rule-based, deep transfer
PROMT	Cross-platform (web application)	Proprietary	Commercial	12.5	No	25+	Hybrid, rule-based, statistical and neural machine translation
Reverso	Cross-platform (web application)	SaaS	No fee required, paid "Premium" version available		No	30+	Neural machine translation
SYSTRAN	Cross-platform (web application)	Proprietary	$200 (desktop) – $15,000 and up (enterprise server)	Version 7	No	60+	Hybrid, rule-based, statistical machine translation and neural machine translation
Translate (Apple)	iOS, iPadOS and watchOS	Proprietary	?		No	20+	Neural machine translation
Yandex Translate	Cross-platform (web application)	SaaS	No fee required		No	120+	Statistical and neural machine translation

== Languages features comparison ==
The following table compares the number of languages which the following machine translation programs can translate between. (Moses and Moses for Mere Mortals allow you to train translation models for any language pair, though collections of translated texts (parallel corpus) need to be provided by the user. The Moses site provides links to training corpora.)

This is not an all-encompassing list. Some applications have many more language pairs than those listed below. This is a general comparison of key languages only. A full and accurate list of language pairs supported by each product should be found on each of the product's websites.

=== Multi-pair translations ===
Language	Language code	In ICU?	Google Translate	Microsoft Translator	DeepL Translator	Yandex Translate	Amazon Translate	PROMT Translate	IBM Watson	Translate (Apple)
Abaza	abq	No	No	No	No	Yes	No	No	No	No
Abkhaz	ab	No	Yes	No	No	Yes	No	No	No	No
Acehnese	ace	No	Yes	Yes	Yes	No	No	No	No	No
Acholi	ach	No	Yes	No	No	No	No	No	No	No
Adyghe	ady	No	No	No	No	Yes	No	No	No	No
Afar	aa	No	Yes	No	No	No	No	No	No	No
Afrikaans	af	Yes	Yes	Yes	Yes	Yes	Yes	No	No	No
Albanian	sq	Yes	Yes	Yes	Yes	Yes	Yes	No	No	No
Altai (south)	alt	No	No	No	No	Yes	No	No	No	No
Alur	alz	No	Yes	No	No	No	No	No	No	No
Amharic	am	Yes	Yes	Yes	No	Yes	Yes	No	No	No
Arabic	ar	Yes	Yes	Yes	Yes	Yes	Yes	Yes	Yes	Yes
Arabic (Egyptian)	arz	Yes	No	Yes	No	No	No	No	No	No
Arabic (Moroccan)	ary	Yes	No	Yes	No	No	No	No	No	No
Aragonese	an	No	No	No	Yes	No	No	No	No	No
Armenian	hy	Yes	Yes	Yes	Yes	Yes	Yes	Yes	No	No
Assamese	as	Yes	Yes	Yes	Yes	No	No	No	No	No
Asturian	ast	Yes	No	Yes	No	No	No	No	No	No
Avar	av	No	Yes	No	No	No	No	No	No	No
Awadhi	awa	No	Yes	No	No	No	No	No	No	No
Aymara	ay	No	Yes	No	Yes	No	No	No	No	No
Azerbaijani	az	Yes	Yes	Yes	Yes	Yes	Yes	Yes	No	No
Balinese	ban	No	Yes	Yes	No	No	No	No	No	No
Baluchi	bal	No	Yes	No	No	No	No	No	No	No
Bambara	bm	Yes	Yes	No	No	No	No	No	No	No
Baoulé	bci	No	Yes	No	No	No	No	No	No	No
Bashkir	ba	No	Yes	Yes	Yes	Yes	No	No	No	No
Basque	eu	Yes	Yes	Yes	Yes	Yes	No	No	Yes	No
Batak Karo	btx	No	Yes	No	No	No	No	No	No	No
Batak Simalungun	bts	No	Yes	No	No	No	No	No	No	No
Batak Toba	bbc	No	Yes	Yes	No	No	No	No	No	No
Belarusian	be	Yes	Yes	Yes	Yes	Yes	No	Yes	No	No
Bemba	bem	Yes	Yes	No	No	No	No	No	No	No
Bengali (Bangla)	bn	Yes	Yes	Yes	Yes	Yes	Yes	Yes	Yes	No
Betawi	bew	No	Yes	No	No	No	No	No	No	No
Bhojpuri	bho	No	Yes	Yes	Yes	No	No	No	No	No
Bikol	bcl	No	Yes	Yes	No	No	No	No	No	No
Bodo	brx	Yes	No	Yes	No	No	No	No	No	No
Bosnian	bs	Yes	Yes	Yes	Yes	Yes	Yes	Yes	Yes	No
Breton	br	Yes	Yes	No	Yes	No	No	No	No	No
Bulgarian	bg	Yes	Yes	Yes	Yes	Yes	Yes	Yes	Yes	No
Burmese	my	Yes	Yes	Yes	Yes	Yes	No	Yes	No	No
Buryat	bua	No	Yes	No	No	Yes	No	No	No	No
Cantonese (Traditional)	yue or zh-Hant-HK	Yes	Yes	Yes	Yes	No	No	No	No	No
Catalan	ca	Yes	Yes	Yes	Yes	Yes	Yes	No	Yes	No
Cebuano	ceb	No	Yes	Yes	Yes	Yes	No	No	No	No
Chamorro	ch	No	Yes	No	No	No	No	No	No	No
Chechen	ce	Yes	Yes	No	No	Yes	No	No	No	No
Chewa (Chichewa/Nyanja)	ny	No	Yes	Yes	No	No	No	No	No	No
Chhattisgarhi	hne	No	No	Yes	No	No	No	No	No	No
Chinese (Simplified)	zh-Hans-CN	Yes	Yes	Yes	Yes	Yes	Yes	Yes	Yes	Yes
Chinese (Traditional)	zh-Hant-TW	Yes	Yes	Yes	Yes	No	Yes	Yes	Yes	Yes
Chuukese	chk	No	Yes	No	No	No	No	No	No	No
Chuvash	cv	No	Yes	No	No	Yes	No	Yes	No	No
Classical Chinese	lzh	No	No	Yes	No	No	No	No	No	No
Corsican	co	No	Yes	Yes	No	No	No	No	No	No
Crimean Tatar	crh	No	Yes	No	No	No	No	No	No	No
Croatian	hr	Yes	Yes	Yes	Yes	Yes	Yes	Yes	Yes	No
Czech	cs	Yes	Yes	Yes	Yes	Yes	Yes	Yes	Yes	No
Danish	da	Yes	Yes	Yes	Yes	Yes	Yes	Yes	Yes	No
Dari	fa-AF or prs	Yes	Yes	Yes	Yes	No	Yes	Yes	No	No
Dhivehi	dv	No	Yes	Yes	No	No	No	No	No	No
Dinka	din	No	Yes	No	No	No	No	No	No	No
Dogri	doi	No	Yes	Yes	No	No	No	No	No	No
Dombe	dov	No	Yes	No	No	No	No	No	No	No
Dutch	nl	Yes	Yes	Yes	Yes	Yes	Yes	Yes	Yes	Yes
Dyula	dyu	No	Yes	No	No	No	No	No	No	No
Dzongkha	dz	Yes	Yes	No	No	No	No	No	No	No
Elvish (Sindarin)	sjn	No	No	No	No	Yes	No	No	No	No
English	en	Yes	Yes	Yes	Yes	Yes	Yes	Yes	Yes	Yes
Erzya	myv	No	No	No	No	Yes	No	No	No	No
Esperanto	eo	Yes	Yes	Yes	Yes	Yes	No	No	No	No
Estonian	et	Yes	Yes	Yes	Yes	Yes	Yes	Yes	Yes	No
Ewe	ee	Yes	Yes	No	No	No	No	No	No	No
Faroese	fo	Yes	Yes	Yes	No	No	No	No	No	No
Fijian	fj	No	Yes	Yes	No	No	No	No	No	No
Finnish	fi	Yes	Yes	Yes	Yes	Yes	Yes	Yes	Yes	No
Fon	fon	No	Yes	No	No	No	No	No	No	No
French	fr	Yes	Yes	Yes	Yes	Yes	Yes	Yes	Yes	Yes
French (Canada)	fr-CA	Yes	Yes	Yes	Yes	No	Yes	No	Yes	No
Frisian (West)	fy	Yes	Yes	Yes	No	No	No	No	No	No
Friulian	fur	Yes	Yes	Yes	No	No	No	No	No	No
Fulani	ff	Yes	Yes	No	No	No	No	No	No	No
Ga	gaa	No	Yes	No	No	No	No	No	No	No
Galician	gl	Yes	Yes	Yes	Yes	Yes	No	No	No	No
Georgian	ka	Yes	Yes	Yes	Yes	Yes	Yes	Yes	No	No
German	de	Yes	Yes	Yes	Yes	Yes	Yes	Yes	Yes	Yes
German (Swiss)	de-CH	Yes	No	No	Yes	No	No	No	No	No
Greek	el	Yes	Yes	Yes	Yes	Yes	Yes	Yes	Yes	No
Guarani	gn	No	Yes	No	Yes	No	No	No	No	No
Gujarati	gu	Yes	Yes	Yes	Yes	Yes	Yes	No	Yes	No
Haitian Creole	ht	No	Yes	Yes	Yes	Yes	Yes	No	No	No
Hakha Chin	cnh	No	Yes	No	No	No	No	No	No	No
Hausa	ha	Yes	Yes	Yes	Yes	No	Yes	No	No	No
Hawaiian	haw	Yes	Yes	No	No	No	No	No	No	No
Hebrew	he	Yes	Yes	Yes	Yes	Yes	Yes	Yes	Yes	No
Hiligaynon	hil	No	Yes	Yes	No	No	No	No	No	No
Hill Mari	mrj	No	No	No	No	Yes	No	No	No	No
Hindi	hi	Yes	Yes	Yes	Yes	Yes	Yes	Yes	Yes	Yes
Hmong (Daw)	hmn or mww	No	Yes	Yes	No	No	No	No	No	No
Hungarian	hu	Yes	Yes	Yes	Yes	Yes	Yes	Yes	Yes	No
Hunsrik	hrx	No	Yes	No	No	No	No	No	No	No
Iban	iba	No	Yes	Yes	No	No	No	No	No	No
Icelandic	is	Yes	Yes	Yes	Yes	Yes	Yes	No	No	No
Igbo	ig	Yes	Yes	Yes	Yes	No	No	No	No	No
Ilocano	ilo	No	Yes	Yes	No	No	No	No	No	No
Indonesian	id	Yes	Yes	Yes	Yes	Yes	Yes	Yes	Yes	Yes
Inuinnaqtun	ikt	No	No	Yes	No	No	No	No	No	No
Inuktitut	iu	No	Yes	Yes	No	No	No	No	No	No
Irish	ga	Yes	Yes	Yes	Yes	Yes	Yes	No	Yes	No
Italian	it	Yes	Yes	Yes	Yes	Yes	Yes	Yes	Yes	Yes
Jamaican Patois	jam	No	Yes	Yes	No	No	No	No	No	No
Japanese	ja	Yes	Yes	Yes	Yes	Yes	Yes	Yes	Yes	Yes
Javanese	jv	No	Yes	Yes	Yes	Yes	No	No	No	No
Jingpo	kac	No	Yes	No	No	No	No	No	No	No
Judeo-Tat	jdt	No	No	No	No	Yes	No	No	No	No
Kabardian	kbd	No	No	No	No	Yes	No	No	No	No
Kabuverdianu	kea	Yes	No	Yes	No	No	No	No	No	No
Kalaallisut	kl	Yes	Yes	No	No	No	No	No	No	No
Kannada	kn	Yes	Yes	Yes	No	Yes	Yes	No	Yes	No
Kanuri	kr	No	Yes	No	No	No	No	No	No	No
Kapampangan	pam	No	Yes	Yes	Yes	No	No	No	No	No
Karachay-Balkar	krc	No	No	No	No	Yes	No	No	No	No
Karelian	krl	No	No	No	No	Yes	No	No	No	No
Kashmiri	ks	Yes	No	Yes	No	No	No	No	No	No
Kazakh	kk	Yes	Yes	Yes	Yes	Yes	Yes	Yes	No	No
Khakas	kjh	No	No	No	No	Yes	No	No	No	No
Khasi	kha	No	Yes	No	No	No	No	No	No	No
Khmer	km	Yes	Yes	Yes	No	Yes	No	No	No	No
Kiga	cgg	Yes	Yes	No	No	No	No	No	No	No
Kikongo	kg	No	Yes	No	No	No	No	No	No	No
Kinyarwanda	rw	Yes	Yes	Yes	No	No	No	No	No	No
Kirundi (Rundi)	rn	Yes	Yes	Yes	No	No	No	No	No	No
Kituba	ktu	No	Yes	No	No	No	No	No	No	No
Klingon	tlh	No	No	Yes	No	No	No	No	No	No
Kokborok	trp	No	Yes	No	No	No	No	No	No	No
Komi	kv	No	Yes	No	No	Yes	No	No	No	No
Konkani	kok	Yes	Yes	Yes	Yes	No	No	No	No	No
Korean	ko	Yes	Yes	Yes	Yes	Yes	Yes	Yes	Yes	Yes
Krio	kri	No	Yes	Yes	No	No	No	No	No	No
Kurdish (Kurmanji)	ku or kmr	No	Yes	Yes	Yes	No	No	Yes	No	No
Kurdish (Sorani)	ckb	Yes	Yes	Yes	Yes	No	No	Yes	No	No
Kyrgyz	ky	Yes	Yes	Yes	Yes	Yes	No	Yes	No	No
Lao	lo	Yes	Yes	Yes	No	Yes	No	Yes	No	No
Latgalian	ltg	No	Yes	No	No	No	No	No	No	No
Latin	la	No	Yes	Yes	Yes	Yes	No	No	No	No
Latvian	lv	Yes	Yes	Yes	Yes	Yes	Yes	Yes	Yes	No
Ligurian (Genoese)	lij	No	Yes	Yes	No	No	No	No	No	No
Limburgish	li	No	Yes	Yes	No	No	No	No	No	No
Lingala	ln	Yes	Yes	Yes	Yes	No	No	No	No	No
Lithuanian	lt	Yes	Yes	Yes	Yes	Yes	Yes	Yes	Yes	No
Lombard	lmo	No	Yes	Yes	Yes	No	No	No	No	No
Lower Sorbian	dsb	Yes	No	Yes	No	No	No	No	No	No
Luganda (Ganda)	lg	Yes	Yes	Yes	No	No	No	No	No	No
Luo	luo	Yes	Yes	No	No	No	No	No	No	No
Luxembourgish	lb	Yes	Yes	Yes	Yes	Yes	No	No	No	No
Macedonian	mk	Yes	Yes	Yes	Yes	Yes	Yes	No	No	No
Madurese	mad	No	Yes	No	No	No	No	No	No	No
Maithili	mai	No	Yes	Yes	Yes	No	No	No	No	No
Makassar	mak	No	Yes	No	No	No	No	No	No	No
Malagasy	mg	Yes	Yes	Yes	Yes	Yes	No	No	No	No
Malay	ms	Yes	Yes	Yes	Yes	Yes	Yes	Yes	Yes	No
Malayalam	ml	Yes	Yes	Yes	Yes	Yes	Yes	No	Yes	No
Maltese	mt	Yes	Yes	Yes	Yes	Yes	Yes	No	Yes	No
Mam	mam	No	Yes	No	No	No	No	No	No	No
Mansi	mns	No	No	No	No	Yes	No	No	No	No
Manx	gv	Yes	Yes	No	No	No	No	No	No	No
Māori	mi	No	Yes	Yes	Yes	Yes	No	No	No	No
Marathi	mr	Yes	Yes	Yes	Yes	Yes	Yes	No	Yes	No
Marshallese	mh	No	Yes	No	No	No	No	No	No	No
Marwadi (Marwari)	mwr	No	Yes	Yes	No	No	No	No	No	No
Mauritian Creole	mfe	Yes	Yes	Yes	No	No	No	No	No	No
Meadow Mari	mhr	No	Yes	No	No	Yes	No	No	No	No
Meitei (Manipuri)	mni	No	Yes	Yes	No	No	No	No	No	No
Minang (Minangkabau)	min	No	Yes	Yes	No	No	No	No	No	No
Mizo	lus	No	Yes	No	No	No	No	No	No	No
Moksha	mdf	No	No	No	No	Yes	No	No	No	No
Mongolian	mn	Yes	Yes	Yes	Yes	Yes	Yes	Yes	No	No
Montenegrin	cnr	No	No	No	No	No	No	No	Yes	No
Nahuatl (Eastern Huasteca)	nhe	No	Yes	No	No	No	No	No	No	No
Ndau	ndc	No	Yes	No	No	No	No	No	No	No
Ndebele (South)	nr	No	Yes	No	No	No	No	No	No	No
Nepalbhasa (Newari)	new	No	Yes	No	No	No	No	No	No	No
Nepali	ne	Yes	Yes	Yes	Yes	Yes	No	No	Yes	No
NKo	nqo	No	Yes	No	No	No	No	No	No	No
Nogai	nog	No	No	No	No	Yes	No	No	No	No
Northern Sotho (Sepedi)	nso	No	Yes	Yes	No	No	No	No	No	No
Norwegian (Bokmål)	nb or no	Yes	Yes	Yes	Yes	Yes	Yes	Yes	Yes	No
Norwegian (Nynorsk)	nn	Yes	No	Yes	No	No	No	Yes	No	No
Nuer	nus	Yes	Yes	No	No	No	No	No	No	No
Occitan	oc	No	Yes	Yes	Yes	No	No	No	No	No
Odia (Oriya)	or	Yes	Yes	Yes	No	No	No	No	No	No
Oromo	om	Yes	Yes	No	Yes	No	No	No	No	No
Ossetian	os	Yes	Yes	No	No	Yes	No	No	No	No
Pangasinan	pag	No	Yes	No	Yes	No	No	No	No	No
Papiamento	pap	No	Yes	Yes	No	Yes	No	No	No	No
Pashto	ps	Yes	Yes	Yes	Yes	No	Yes	Yes	No	No
Persian (Farsi)	fa	Yes	Yes	Yes	Yes	Yes	Yes	Yes	No	No
Polish	pl	Yes	Yes	Yes	Yes	Yes	Yes	Yes	Yes	Yes
Portuguese	pt	Yes	Yes	Yes	Yes	Yes	Yes	Yes	Yes	No
Portuguese (Brazil)	pt-BR	Yes	Yes	Yes	Yes	Yes	Yes	No	No	Yes
Punjabi	pa	Yes	Yes	Yes	Yes	Yes	Yes	No	Yes	No
Q'eqchi'	kek	No	Yes	No	No	No	No	No	No	No
Quechua	qu	Yes	Yes	No	Yes	No	No	No	No	No
Querétaro Otomi	otq	No	No	Yes	No	No	No	No	No	No
Romani	rom	No	Yes	No	No	No	No	No	No	No
Romanian	ro	Yes	Yes	Yes	Yes	Yes	Yes	Yes	Yes	No
Russian	ru	Yes	Yes	Yes	Yes	Yes	Yes	Yes	Yes	Yes
Sami (North)	se	Yes	Yes	No	No	No	No	No	No	No
Samoan	sm	No	Yes	Yes	No	No	No	No	No	No
Sango	sg	Yes	Yes	No	No	No	No	No	No	No
Sanskrit	sa	No	Yes	Yes	Yes	No	No	No	No	No
Santali	sat	No	Yes	No	No	No	No	No	No	No
Sardinian	sc	No	No	Yes	No	No	No	No	No	No
Scottish Gaelic	gd	Yes	Yes	No	No	Yes	No	No	No	No
Serbian	sr	Yes	Yes	Yes	Yes	Yes	Yes	Yes	Yes	No
Seychellois Creole	crs	No	Yes	Yes	No	No	No	No	No	No
Shan	shn	No	Yes	No	No	No	No	No	No	No
Shona	sn	Yes	Yes	Yes	No	No	No	No	No	No
Sicilian	scn	No	Yes	Yes	Yes	No	No	No	No	No
Silesian	szl	No	Yes	No	No	No	No	No	No	No
Sindhi	sd	No	Yes	Yes	No	No	No	No	No	No
Sinhala (Sinhalese)	si	Yes	Yes	Yes	No	Yes	Yes	No	Yes	No
Slovak	sk	Yes	Yes	Yes	Yes	Yes	Yes	Yes	Yes	No
Slovenian	sl	Yes	Yes	Yes	Yes	Yes	Yes	No	Yes	No
Somali	so	Yes	Yes	Yes	No	No	Yes	No	No	No
Sotho (Sesotho)	st	No	Yes	Yes	Yes	No	No	No	No	No
Spanish	es	Yes	Yes	Yes	Yes	Yes	Yes	Yes	Yes	Yes
Spanish (Latin America)	es-419	Yes	No	No	Yes	No	No	No	No	No
Spanish (Mexico)	es-MX	Yes	No	Yes	No	No	Yes	No	No	No
Sundanese	su	No	Yes	Yes	Yes	Yes	No	No	No	No
Susu	sus	No	Yes	No	No	No	No	No	No	No
Swahili	sw	Yes	Yes	Yes	Yes	Yes	Yes	Yes	No	No
Swati	ss	No	Yes	No	No	No	No	No	No	No
Swedish	sv	Yes	Yes	Yes	Yes	Yes	Yes	Yes	Yes	No
Tagalog (Filipino)	fil or tl	Yes	Yes	Yes	Yes	Yes	Yes	Yes	No	No
Tahitian	ty	No	Yes	Yes	No	No	No	No	No	No
Tajik	tg	Yes	Yes	Yes	Yes	Yes	No	Yes	No	No
Tamazight	ber	No	Yes	No	No	No	No	No	No	No
Tamil	ta	Yes	Yes	Yes	Yes	Yes	Yes	No	Yes	No
Tatar	tt	Yes	Yes	Yes	Yes	Yes	No	Yes	No	No
Telugu	te	Yes	Yes	Yes	Yes	Yes	Yes	No	Yes	No
Tetum	tet	No	Yes	Yes	No	No	No	No	No	No
Thai	th	Yes	Yes	Yes	Yes	Yes	Yes	Yes	Yes	Yes
Tibetan	bo	Yes	Yes	Yes	No	No	No	No	No	No
Tigrinya	ti	Yes	Yes	Yes	No	No	No	No	No	No
Tiv	tiv	No	Yes	No	No	No	No	No	No	No
Tok Pisin	tpi	No	Yes	Yes	No	No	No	No	No	No
Tongan	to	Yes	Yes	Yes	No	No	No	No	No	No
Tshiluba	lua	No	Yes	No	No	No	No	No	No	No
Tsonga	ts	No	Yes	No	Yes	No	No	No	No	No
Tswana (Setswana)	tn	No	Yes	Yes	Yes	No	No	No	No	No
Tulu	tcy	No	Yes	No	No	No	No	No	No	No
Tumbuka	tum	No	Yes	No	No	No	No	No	No	No
Turkish	tr	Yes	Yes	Yes	Yes	Yes	Yes	Yes	Yes	Yes
Turkmen	tk	No	Yes	Yes	Yes	No	No	Yes	No	No
Tuvan	tyv	No	Yes	No	No	Yes	No	No	No	No
Twi	tw	No	Yes	No	No	No	No	No	No	No
Udmurt	udm	No	Yes	No	No	Yes	No	No	No	No
Ukrainian	uk	Yes	Yes	Yes	Yes	Yes	Yes	Yes	Yes	Yes
Upper Sorbian	hsb	Yes	No	Yes	No	No	No	No	No	No
Urdu	ur	Yes	Yes	Yes	Yes	Yes	Yes	Yes	Yes	No
Uyghur	ug	Yes	Yes	Yes	No	No	No	No	No	No
Uzbek	uz	Yes	Yes	Yes	Yes	Yes	Yes	Yes	No	No
Venda	ve	No	Yes	No	No	No	No	No	No	No
Venetian	vec	No	Yes	Yes	No	No	No	No	No	No
Vietnamese	vi	Yes	Yes	Yes	Yes	Yes	Yes	Yes	Yes	Yes
Waray	war	No	Yes	Yes	No	No	No	No	No	No
Welsh	cy	Yes	Yes	Yes	Yes	Yes	Yes	No	Yes	No
Wolof	wo	Yes	Yes	No	Yes	No	No	No	No	No
Xhosa	xh	No	Yes	Yes	Yes	Yes	No	No	No	No
Yakut	sah	Yes	Yes	No	No	Yes	No	No	No	No
Yiddish (Eastern)	yi	Yes	Yes	Yes	Yes	Yes	No	No	No	No
Yoruba	yo	Yes	Yes	Yes	No	No	No	No	No	No
Yucatec Maya	yua	No	Yes	Yes	No	No	No	No	No	No
Zapotec	zap	No	Yes	No	No	No	No	No	No	No
Zulu	zu	Yes	Yes	Yes	Yes	Yes	No	No	No	No
Total (confirmed)		142	249	182	120	121	75	62	57	21

=== Paired translations ===
Language	Language	Apertium	OpenLogos	GramTrans	SYSTRAN
Afrikaans	Dutch	⇆	No	No	No
Arabic	English	No	No	No	⇆
Arabic	Maltese	←	No	No	No
Aragonese	Catalan	⇆	No	No	No
Aragonese	Spanish	⇆	No	No	No
Arpitan	French	←	No	No	No
Asturian	Spanish	←	No	No	No
Basque	English	→	No	No	No
Basque	Spanish	→	No	No	No
Belarusian	Russian	⇆	No	No	No
Breton	French	→	No	No	No
Bulgarian	Macedonian	⇆	No	No	No
Catalan	Danish	No	No	←	No
Catalan	English	⇆	No	No	No
Catalan	Esperanto	→	No	No	No
Catalan	French	⇆	No	No	No
Catalan	Italian	⇆	No	No	No
Catalan	Occitan	⇆	No	No	No
Catalan	Portuguese	⇆	No	No	No
Catalan	Romanian	⇆	No	No	No
Catalan	Sardinian	←	No	No	No
Catalan	Spanish	⇆	No	No	No
Chinese (Simplified)	English	No	No	No	⇆
Chinese (Traditional)	English	No	No	No	⇆
Crimean Tatar	Turkish	→	No	No	No
Czech	English	No	No	No	⇆
Danish	English	No	No	⇆	→
Danish	Esperanto	No	No	→	No
Danish	Galician	No	No	→	No
Danish	German	No	No	⇆	No
Danish	Norwegian (Bokmål)	⇆	No	⇆	No
Danish	Portuguese	No	No	←	No
Danish	Spanish	No	No	⇆	No
Danish	Swedish	⇆	No	⇆	No
Dutch	English	No	No	No	⇆
Dutch	French	No	No	No	⇆
English	Esperanto	⇆	No	→	No
English	Finnish	No	No	No	⇆
English	French	No	←	No	⇆
English	Galician	⇆	No	No	No
English	German	No	⇆	No	⇆
English	Greek	No	No	No	⇆
English	Hindi	No	No	No	←
English	Hungarian	No	No	No	⇆
English	Icelandic	←	No	No	No
English	Italian	No	←	No	⇆
English	Japanese	No	No	No	⇆
English	Korean	No	No	No	⇆
English	Latvian	No	No	No	←
English	Lithuanian	No	←	No	No
English	Macedonian	←	No	No	No
English	Norwegian	No	No	⇆	←
English	Persian	No	No	No	←
English	Polish	No	No	No	⇆
English	Portuguese	No	←	←	⇆
English	Romanian	No	No	No	⇆
English	Russian	No	←	No	⇆
English	Serbo-Croatian	←	No	No	No
English	Slovak	No	No	No	←
English	Slovene	No	No	No	←
English	Spanish	⇆	←	No	⇆
English	Swedish	No	No	⇆	⇆
English	Turkish	No	No	No	⇆
English	Ukrainian	No	No	No	⇆
English	Welsh	←	No	No	No
Esperanto	French	←	No	No	No
Esperanto	Norwegian	No	No	←	No
Esperanto	Portuguese	No	No	←	No
Esperanto	Spanish	←	No	No	No
Estonian	English	No	No	No	→
French	German	No	No	No	⇆
French	Italian	No	No	No	⇆
French	Occitan	⇆	No	No	No
French	Russian	No	←	No	No
French	Spanish	⇆	No	No	⇆
Galician	Portuguese	⇆	No	No	No
Galician	Spanish	⇆	No	No	No
German	Italian	No	No	No	⇆
German	Spanish	No	No	No	⇆
Hindi	Urdu	⇆	No	No	No
Icelandic	Swedish	⇆	No	No	No
Indonesian	Malaysian	⇆	No	No	No
Italian	Sardinian	⇆	No	No	No
Italian	Spanish	No	No	No	←
Kazakh	Tatar	⇆	No	No	No
Macedonian	Serbo-Croatian	←	No	No	No
North Sámi	Norwegian	→	No	No	No
Norwegian	Swedish	⇆	No	⇆	No
Norwegian (Nynorsk)	Norwegian (Bokmål)	⇆	No	No	No
Occitan	Spanish	⇆	No	No	No
Polish	Silesian	→	No	No	No
Portuguese	Spanish	⇆	No	No	No
Romanian	Spanish	→	No	No	No
Russian	Ukrainian	⇆	No	No	No
Serbo-Croatian	Slovene	⇆	No	No	No
Total (confirmed)		83	9	24	63

== See also ==
- Machine translation software usability
- Computer-assisted translation
- Comparison of computer-assisted translation tools
