= PROMT =

Russian language translation software company

ProMT
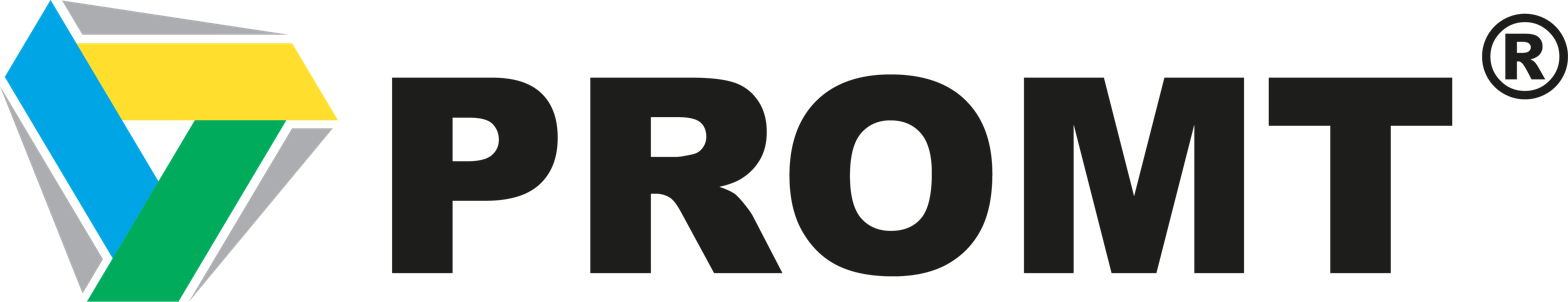
- Founded: 1991
- Products: Neural machine translation systems
- Website: www.promt.com

ProMT is a lead Russian developer of language translation software for businesses and private users since 1991. The company provides on-premises software based on neural technologies.

== History ==
On March 6, 1998, ProMT launched a free online translation services, which is now known as PROMT.One.

In 1997, ProMT and the French company Softissimo developed a line of products for the European company Reverso.

== Technology ==
Historically, ProMT systems used rule-based machine translation (RBMT) technology. In 2011 a hybrid approach which combined rule-based and statistical MT was implemented.

In 2019, ProMT introduced its new neural technology and flagship solution - PROMT Neural Translation Server. Since then all MT systems developed by ProMT are based on neural machine translation.

The software can run on Microsoft Windows, Linux, MacOS, iOS and Android and works in offline mode providing secure machine translation.

As of 2025, it translates 62 languages from and to English, German, and Russian.

== See also ==
- Comparison of machine translation applications
- DeepL Translator
- Babylon
- Google Translate
- Systran
- vidby
- Yandex Translate
