= Internettolken =

Online language translation tool

Internettolken (or InternetPreter) is a web-based machine translating tool.

As the first Swedish online translating service, it was started in 2002 and included the English and Swedish languages. Today, there are 14 languages with more than 120 possible combinations.

The service is free up to 150 words per day, and as a 2,000-word free testing account. It is available both on its website, and as a gadget on iGoogle. The interface is either English or Swedish.

Being a dictionary-based tool, with its own translation software, it can sometimes offer a more accurate translation than Google Translate and others, although the grammar will be incorrect.

== Languages currently available ==
- Danish
- Dutch
- English
- Finnish
- French
- German
- Hungarian
- Icelandic
- Italian
- Norwegian
- Portuguese
- Russian
- Spanish
- Swedish
