= WiperSoft =

Anti-spyware program by Wiper Software

- Developer: Wiper Software
- Initial release: 2015
- Stable release: 1.1.1157.64
- Written in: C++
- Operating system: Microsoft Windows
- Available in: English, German, French, Italian, Russian, Spanish, and others
- License: Proprietary software
- Website: www.wipersoft.com

WiperSoft is an anti-spyware program developed by Wiper Software. It is designed to help users protect their computers from such threats as adware, browser hijackers, worms, potentially unwanted programs (PUPs), trojans, and viruses. Currently available only for Microsoft Windows.

== History ==
WiperSoft was launched in 2015 and was available as a free program for home users. Users were able to use the scan and removal functions without having to buy a subscription.

In 2016, it was re-released with a new design, improved detection and removal functionalities and a more user-friendly interface. That same year, WiperSoft also became a paid program.

WiperSoft saw a big increase in downloads and sales in 2017, and is reportedly used by 1 million users from 120 countries.

It was tested by Softpedia in 2017 and was rated 100% Clean.

== Product ==
WiperSoft is primarily an anti-spyware program, and comes in two versions. Free WiperSoft offers users to scan their computers for malware. Paid WiperSoft features include malware detection and removal, help desk services and custom fix.

According to Wiper Software, the program can detect and remove threats like potentially unwanted programs, adware, browser hijackers, questionable toolbars, browser add-ons, viruses, trojans and more. Detected potential threats are not automatically deleted, and users have the option of keeping them installed. The program will also undo the changes made by detected threats, such as change of homepage or default search engine.

=== Availability ===
The program is currently only available for Microsoft Windows users. All popular browsers, such as Google Chrome, Mozilla Firefox, Internet Explorer and Opera are supported. The program is available in 10 languages.
