= Parallel translation =

Parallel translation may refer to:

- Parallel transport, in differential geometry
- Parallel text, placed alongside its translation or translations
