= Hao123 =

Chinese online listings portal

Hao123 website in the Google Chrome (Simplified Chinese version)

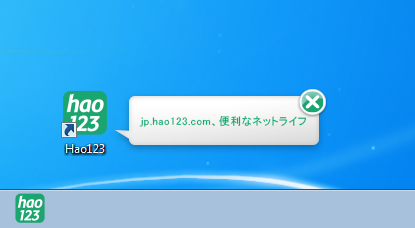
Hao123 shortcuts installed by a software bundle (Japanese edition)

Hao123 is a Chinese online listings portal by Baidu. It also has versions in other languages, such as in Portuguese (for Brazil) and in Thai (for Thailand).

Hao123 has been accused of being a malicious browser hijacker, as it often installs itself without user's consent after being installed by another application, and once installed it is difficult to remove. Hao123 has been accused of using Windows service, registry and browser parameters to modify the browser's default setting and prevent being removed or uninstalled by adding itself back through Windows service. It also sniffs user's internet traffic illegally and forces users to visit its website to improve its website traffic ranking. For this reason, Hao123 is considered as malware by many anti-virus programs.

Since September 2011, foreign language versions such as Thai have been launched. However, because Baidu antivirus software will force hao123 to be the IE homepage, it was boycotted by Thai netizens.

== Capping ==
- Official website (in Chinese)
- Brazilian version (in Portuguese)
- Thai version (in Thai)
- Japanese version (in Japanese)
