= SYSTRAN =

Machine translation company

SYSTRAN Translate
- Website type: Neural machine translation
- Available in: 55 languages (140 combinations)
- Owner: Olivier Dellenbach
- Founder: Dr. Peter Toma
- Website: www.chapsvision.com/solution/systran-translate/
- Commercial: Yes
- Registration: Optional
- Launched: 1968; 58 years ago
- Current status: Active

SYSTRAN, founded by Dr. Peter Toma in 1968, is one of the oldest machine translation companies. SYSTRAN has done extensive work for the United States Department of Defense and the European Commission.

SYSTRAN provided the technology for Yahoo! Babel Fish until May 30, 2012, among others. It was used by Google's language tools until 2007. SYSTRAN is used by the Dashboard Translation widget in macOS.

Commercial versions of SYSTRAN can run on Microsoft Windows (including Windows Mobile), Linux, and Solaris. Historically, SYSTRAN systems used rule-based machine translation (RbMT) technology. With the release of SYSTRAN Server 7 in 2010, SYSTRAN implemented a hybrid rule-based/statistical machine translation (SMT) technology which was the first of its kind in the marketplace.

As of 2008, the company had 59 employees of whom 26 are computational experts and 15 computational linguists. The number of employees decreased from 70 in 2006 to 59 in 2008.

In January 2024, ChapsVision acquired Systran.

== History ==
With its origin in the Georgetown machine translation effort, SYSTRAN was one of the few machine translation systems to survive the major decrease of funding after the ALPAC Report of the mid-1960s. The company was established in La Jolla in California to work on translation of Russian to English text for the United States Air Force during the Cold War. Large numbers of Russian scientific and technical documents were translated using SYSTRAN under the auspices of the USAF Foreign Technology Division (later the National Air and Space Intelligence Center) at Wright-Patterson Air Force Base, Ohio. The quality of the translations, although only approximate, was usually adequate for understanding content.

The company headquarters is in Paris, while its U.S. headquarters is in San Diego, CA.

During the dot-com boom, the international language industry started a new era, and SYSTRAN entered into agreements with a number of translation integrators, the most successful of these being WorldLingo.

In 2016, the Harvard NLP group and SYSTRAN founded OpenNMT, an open source ecosystem for neural machine translation and neural sequence learning. This has enabled machine translation software with learning capabilities, dramatically increasing MT translation quality. The project has since been used in several research and industry applications, and its open source ecosystem is currently maintained by SYSTRAN and Ubiqus.

== Business situation ==
Most of SYSTRAN's revenue comes from a few customers. 57.1% comes from the 10 main customers and the three largest customers account for 10.9%, 8.9%, and 8.9% of its revenues, respectively. Revenues had been declining in the early 2000s: 10.2 million euros in 2004, 10.1 million euros in 2005, 9.3 million euros in 2006, 8.8 million euros in 2007, and 7.6 million euros in 2008, before seeing a rebound in 2009 with 8.6 million euros.

== Languages ==
The following is a list of languages in which SYSTRAN can translate in:

- Afrikaans
- Albanian
- Arabic
- Armenian
- Belarusian
- Bengali
- Bosnian
- Bulgarian
- Burmese
- Catalan
- Chinese (Simplified)
- Chinese (Traditional)
- Croatian
- Czech
- Danish
- Dutch
- English
- Estonian
- Finnish
- French
- Georgian
- German
- Greek
- Hausa
- Hebrew
- Hindi
- Hungarian
- Icelandic
- Indonesian
- Irish
- Italian
- Japanese
- Kazakh
- Korean
- Kurdish (source language only)
- Latvian
- Lithuanian
- Macedonian
- Malay
- Maltese
- Mongolian
- Montenegrin
- Nepali
- Norwegian
- Norwegian Bokmål (target language only)
- Norwegian Nynorsk (target language only)
- Oromo (source language only)
- Pashto
- Persian
- Polish
- Portuguese
- Punjabi
- Romanian
- Russian
- Serbian
- Slovak
- Slovenian
- Somali
- Spanish
- Swahili
- Swedish
- Tagalog
- Tajik
- Tamil
- Thai
- Turkish
- Ukrainian
- Urdu
- Vietnamese

- Russian into English in 1968 and English into Russian in 1973 for the Apollo–Soyuz project.

== See also ==
- Bilingual dictionary
- Bing Translator
- Comparison of machine translation applications
- Google Translate
- PROMT
- Reverso
