= GramTrans =

Cross-platform machine translation platform

Logo of GramTrans

GramTrans is a cross-platform machine translation platform developed in cooperation between Danish GrammarSoft ApS and Norwegian Kaldera Språkteknologi AS. The translation engine is transfer-based.

GramTrans offers free web-based translation for the Scandinavian languages, based on university research in natural language processing (NLP), corpus linguistics, and lexicography.

== Languages ==
As of September 2008, the available translations are:

Translation	Text	Web Page
Danish to English	Yes	Yes
Danish to Esperanto	Yes	Yes
Danish to Norwegian	Yes	Yes
Danish to Swedish	Yes	Yes
English to Danish	Yes	Yes
English to Esperanto	Yes	Yes
English to Norwegian	Yes	Yes
English to Swedish	Yes	Yes
Norwegian to Danish	Yes	Yes
Norwegian to English	Yes	Yes
Norwegian to Esperanto	Yes	No
Norwegian to Swedish	Yes	Yes
Portuguese to Danish	Yes	No
Portuguese to English	Yes	No
Portuguese to Esperanto	Yes	No
Swedish to Danish	Yes	Yes
Swedish to English	Yes	Yes
Swedish to Norwegian	Yes	Yes

== See also ==
- Comparison of machine translation applications
- Machine translation
