= Babylon (software) =

Computer dictionary and translation program

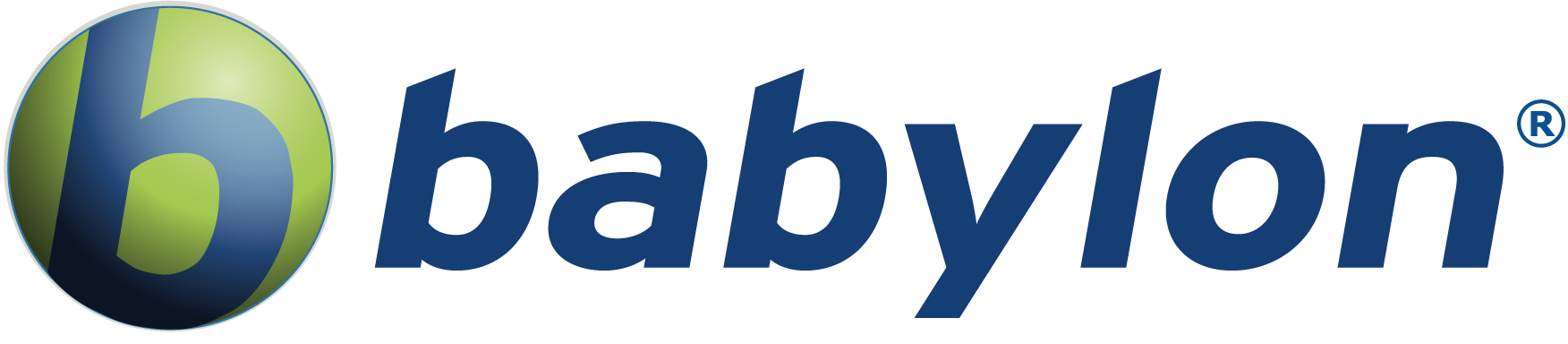

- Babylon version 10.0
- Original author: Amnon Ovadia
- Developer: Babylon Software Ltd.

Stable release(s) [±]
- Windows: 11.0.1.6 / 22 June 2021; 5 years ago
- Android: 4.1.2 / 16 December 2016; 9 years ago
- iOS: 2.0.1 / 14 February 2013; 13 years ago
- Windows Phone: 1.0 / 18 January 2012; 14 years ago
- Operating system: Windows Vista and later; Android 2.3.3 and later; iOS 5.1 or later; Windows Phone 8 and 8.1
- Type: Dictionary, machine translator
- License: Freemium
- Website: babylon-software.com

Babylon is a computer dictionary and translation program developed by the Israeli company Babylon Software Ltd. based in the city of Or Yehuda. The company was established in 1997 by the Israeli entrepreneur Amnon Ovadia. Its IPO took place ten years later. It is considered a part of Israel's Download Valley, a cluster of software companies monetizing "free" software downloads through adware. Babylon includes in-house proprietary dictionaries, as well as community-created dictionaries and glossaries. It is a tool used for translation and conversion of currencies, measurements and time, and for obtaining other contextual information. The program also uses a text-to-speech agent, so users hear the proper pronunciation of words and text. Babylon has developed 36 English-based proprietary dictionaries in 21 languages. In 2008–2009, Babylon reported earnings of 50 million NIS through its collaboration with Google.

Between 2010 and 2013, Babylon became infamous for demonstrating questionable behavior typical of malware: A Babylon Toolbar bundled with Babylon and other software, has been widely identified as a browser hijacker that is very easy to install inadvertently and unnecessarily difficult to remove. This eventually led to Google terminating its agreement with Babylon Ltd. in 2013.

== History ==
In 1995, Israeli entrepreneur Amnon Ovadia began a project for an online English–Hebrew dictionary that would not interrupt the reading process. As a result, Babylon Ltd. was founded in 1997 and launched the first version of Babylon. On 25 September 1997, the company filed a patent for text recognition and translation. In 1998, a year following its launch date, Babylon had two million users, mostly in Germany and Brazil, growing from 420,000 to 2.5 million users in the course of that year. In the same year, Formula Systems, headed by Dan Goldstein, acquired Mashov Computers, and became the largest shareholder in the company. By 2000, the product had over 4 million users. In the spring of 2000, Babylon Ltd. failed to raise $20 million in a private placement and lost NIS 15 million. Further stress came with the collapse of the Dot-com bubble. In 2001, Babylon Ltd. continued shedding money, with the company costing its parent company Formula Vision NIS 4.7 million.

Since 2007, Babylon Ltd. (TASE: BBYL) has been a publicly traded company. Its IPO took place in February 2007; Israeli businessman Noam Lanir purchased controlling interests in the company for $10.5 million, sharing management with second majority shareholder Reed Elsevier and the Company founder, Amnon Ovadia. According to Globes magazine in January 2011, Lanir received an offer for his stake from a foreign private equity fund that valued the company at NIS 248 million (approximately 70 million dollars).

In 2008–2009, Babylon reported earnings of NIS 50 million through its collaboration with Google. In 2010, Google Ireland signed an extended cooperation agreement with Babylon to provide it with online search and pay-per-click advertising services.

In 2011, Babylon was named the seventh most popular website in Libya, the eighth in Algeria and the eleventh in Tunisia.

According to Globes magazine, Noam Lanir, who acquired control of Babylon for NIS 20 million, made a paper profit of NIS 200 million on his investment in 2012. According to the same source, the Babylon website achieved an Alexa ranking of 45 in April 2012.

In October 2014, the translation business was purchased by Babylon Software Ltd.

== Product features ==
A single click on any text using the right mouse button or combination of the right mouse button and a keyboard modifier, and the Babylon window appears providing a translation and definition of the clicked term. Babylon is a tool used for translation and conversion of currencies, measurements and time, and for obtaining other contextual information. Babylon has a patented OCR technology and a single-click activation that works in any Microsoft Windows application, such as Microsoft Word, Microsoft Outlook, Microsoft Excel, Internet Explorer and Adobe Reader. When activated, Babylon opens a small popup window that displays the translation or definition. To solve the incompatibility problem of Babylon OCR browsers extension; users can benefit from Capture2Text free app version 3.9 (only 3.9v) which is compatible with Babylon 8 or another version. While dragging its capture box in any text from any browsers, then a pop-up box appears and Babylon could easily grasp it. Babylon provides full text translation, full Web page and full document translation in many languages and supports integration with Microsoft Office. Babylon enables the translation of Microsoft Word documents and plain text files. It offers results from a database of over 1,700 sources in over 75 languages.

=== Dictionaries and encyclopedias ===
Babylon includes its in-house proprietary dictionaries, community-created dictionaries and glossaries (UGC), which include general and technical dictionaries, language and monolingual dictionaries, thesauri, encyclopedias and lexicons in a multitude of languages. They are indexed in 400 categories covering the arts, business, computers, health, law, entertainment, sports and so on.

The program also uses a text-to-speech agent so users hear the proper pronunciation of words and text. Babylon Ltd. has developed 36 English-based proprietary dictionaries in 21 languages (English, Arabic, Simplified Chinese, Traditional Chinese, Czech, Danish, Dutch, French, German, Greek, Hebrew, Italian, Japanese, Korean, Norwegian, Polish, Portuguese, Russian, Spanish, Swedish and Turkish) that are free of charge to users of the software. These dictionaries comprise between 60,000 and 200,000 terms, phrases, acronyms and abbreviations and are enabled with a morphological engine which facilitates recognition of all inflected forms of single words and phrases, provides all forms of terms that include prefixes and extensions and supplies a solution for all formats of writing. Babylon's Linguistic Department is responsible for the extensive content and information database which is a significant component of Babylon's Product.

== Malware issues ==
Installer window from Download.com during the controversy with Nmap. After clicking on the green button, it installs the Babylon Toolbar, which hijacks the user's web browser.

On 7 August 2010, Microsoft antivirus products identified the software application as adware (identified as "Adware: Win32/Babylon") due to potentially intrusive behavior. Sixteen days later, on 23 August 2010, Microsoft announced that Babylon Ltd. had modified the program and that it was no longer categorized as adware.

In 2011, Download.com started bundling the Babylon Toolbar with open-source packages such as Nmap. Gordon Lyon, the developer of Nmap, criticized the decision. The vice-president of Download.com, Sean Murphy, released an apology: "The bundling of this software was a mistake on our part and we apologize to the user and developer communities for the unrest it caused."

In 2012 the Babylon search toolbar was identified as a browser hijacker that, while very easy to install inadvertently, is unnecessarily difficult to remove afterwards. The toolbar is listed as an unwanted application by anti-spyware software such as Stopzilla or Spybot – Search & Destroy. Many users, trying to uninstall Babylon, have searched for help on different support forums. The toolbar tends to install itself onto computers as an add-on with other software and changes users' home page to the Babylon search engine, adds the search engine to the computer and sets itself as the default. It changes browser preferences such as the user's home page and search engine, changes that can be very difficult to reverse.

On 29 October 2013, Google notified Babylon that it did not intend to renew its cooperation agreement between the two companies, which terminated on 30 November 2013. Google said that complaints had been received from Google Chrome users, claiming that the Babylon toolbar damages the browser's user experience. According to Babylon, Google may have reconsidered the decision during 2014. Since that point Babylon Software no longer distributes any toolbars or offers any 3rd party software.

== See also ==
- Anki
- StarDict
- Comparison of machine translation applications
- Download Valley
