= Anusaaraka =

- Written in: CLIPS, Python, Perl, C, C++
- Operating system: POSIX compatible
- Available in: English-Hindi
- Type: Machine translation
- License: GNU General Public License
- Website: https://ltrc.iiit.ac.in/Anusaaraka/anu_home.html

Anusaaraka is an English to Hindi language accessing (translation) software, which employs algorithms derived from Pāṇini's Ashtadhyayi (Grammar rules). The software is being developed by the Chinmaya International Foundation (CIF) at the International Institute of Information Technology, Hyderabad (IIIT-H) and the University of Hyderabad Department of Sanskrit Studies. Anusaaraka is viewed as the fusion of traditional advanced Indian shastras and advanced contemporary technologies.

Anusaaraka is intended to allow users to access text in any Indian language after translation from the source language (i.e. English or any other regional Indian language). In today's Information Age large volumes of information are available in English – whether it be information for competitive exams or general reading. Many people whose primary language is Hindi or any other Indian language are unable to access information in English. Anusaaraka aims to bridge this language barrier by allowing a user to enter an English text into Anusaaraka and read it in an Indian language of their choice.

Anusaaraka derives its name from the Sanskrit word "anusaran" which means "to follow." It is so called, as the translated Anusaaraka output appears in layers – i.e. a sequence of steps that follow each other till the final translation is displayed to the user.

== Features ==
=== Faithful representation of text in source language ===
Throughout the various layers of Anusaaraka output, there is an effort to ensure that the user should be able to understand the information contained in the English sentence. This effort is given greater importance than giving perfect sentences in Hindi, for it would be pointless to have a translation that reads well but does not truly capture the information of the source text.

The layered output is unique to Anusaaraka. Thus, source language text information and how the Hindi translation is finally arrived at can be accessed by the user. The critical feature of the layered output is that the information transfer is done in a controlled manner at every step thus, making it possible to revert without any loss of information. Also, any damage to information that cannot be avoided in a translation process is then done gradually. Therefore, even if the translated sentence is not as 'perfect' as human translation, with some effort and orientation on reading Anusaaraka output, an individual can understand what the source text is implying by looking at the layers and context in which that sentence appears.

=== Reversibility ===
The feature of gradual transference of information from one layer to the next gives Anusaaraka an additional advantage of bringing reversibility in the translation process – a feature which cannot be achieved by a conventional machine translation system. A bilingual user of Anusaaraka can, at any point, access the source language text in English, because of the transparency in the output. Some amount of orientation on how to read the Anusaaraka output would be required for this.

=== Transparency ===
Display of step-by-step translation layers gives an increased level of confidence to the end-user, as he can trace back to the source and get clarity regarding translated text by analysis of the output layers and some reference to context.

== Sample output ==
A sample output of Anusaaraka system.

The colors in the output indicate the word category:

noun-phrase
verb-phrase
adjectival-phrase
adverbial-phrase
preposition
conjunctions
interjections

== See also ==
- Comparison of machine translation applications
