= DeepL Translator =

Multilingual neural machine translation service

DeepL
- Website type: Neural machine translation
- Available in: 120 languages
- Headquarters: Cologne, North Rhine-Westphalia, Germany
- Owner: DeepL SE
- Key people: Jarosław Kutyłowski
- Website: deepl.com
- Commercial: Yes
- Registration: Optional
- Launched: 28 August 2017; 9 years ago
- Current status: Active

DeepL is a German AI research company known for its language AI platform, which includes DeepL Translator and DeepL Voice, and for DeepL Agent, an AI agent capable of planning workflows and using office systems and tools autonomously, in response to natural language instructions. Its algorithm uses the transformer architecture. It offers a paid subscription for additional features and access to its translation application programming interface. DeepL was founded in 2017 by Jaroslaw Kutylowski and is a unicorn, valued at $2 billion after a Series C funding round raised $300 million in May 2024. Its more than 200,000 business customers include a large proportion of the Fortune 500.

== History ==
The translating system was first developed within Linguee by a team led by Chief Technology Officer Jarosław Kutyłowski in 2016. It was launched as DeepL Translator on 28 August 2017 and offered translations between English, German, French, Spanish, Italian, Polish and Dutch. At its launch, it claimed to have surpassed its competitors in blind tests and BLEU scores, including Google Translate, Amazon Translate, Microsoft Translator and Facebook's translation feature. With the release of DeepL in 2017, Linguee's company name was changed to DeepL GmbH, and it is also financed by advertising on its sister site, linguee.com. Support for Portuguese and Russian was added on December 5, 2018. In July 2019, Jarosław Kutyłowski became the CEO of DeepL GmbH and restructured the company into a Societas Europaea in 2021. Translation software for Microsoft Windows and macOS was released in September 2019. Support for Chinese (simplified) and Japanese was added on 19 March 2020, which the company claimed to have surpassed the aforementioned competitors as well as Baidu and Youdao. Then, 13 more European languages were added in March 2021: Bulgarian, Czech, Danish, Estonian, Finnish, Greek, Hungarian, Latvian, Lithuanian, Romanian, Slovak, Slovenian, and Swedish, bringing the total number of supported languages to 24. On 25 May 2022, support for Indonesian and Turkish was added, and support for Ukrainian was added on 14 September 2022. In January 2023, the company reached a valuation of 1 billion euro and became the most valued startup company in Cologne. At the end of the month, support for Korean and Norwegian (Bokmål) was also added. In May 2024, the company announced an investment of US$300 million at AI. In January 2026, more languages were supported, including Luxembourgish and Irish.

== Services ==
=== Translation method ===
DeepL uses proprietary neural machine translation models. The original system launched in 2017 used convolutional neural networks (CNNs) and was trained using multilingual translation data accumulated through Linguee.

In 2021, DeepL stated that its neural networks incorporated elements of the Transformer architecture, including attention mechanisms, while differing from standard Transformer models in their network topology. In July 2024, the company introduced a new large language model for its translation service, trained on proprietary translation data and optimized for translation tasks.

At the time of its launch, DeepL deployed a 5.1-petaflop supercomputer at Verne Global's data centre in Iceland for training its neural networks. The facility was powered by hydroelectric and geothermal energy. DeepL subsequently expanded its computing infrastructure in Falun, Sweden; in 2025 it deployed an Nvidia DGX SuperPOD using GB200 systems at EcoDataCenter's facility there for model training.

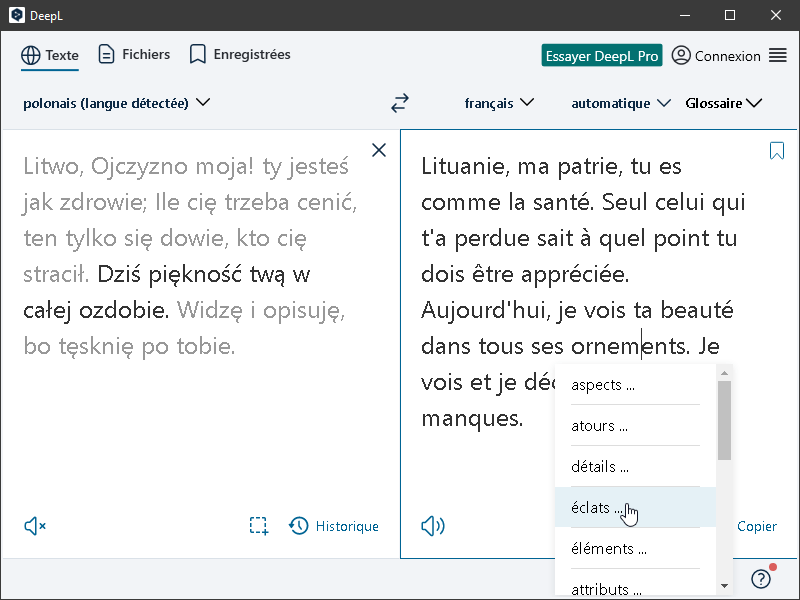
DeepL for Windows translating from Polish to French

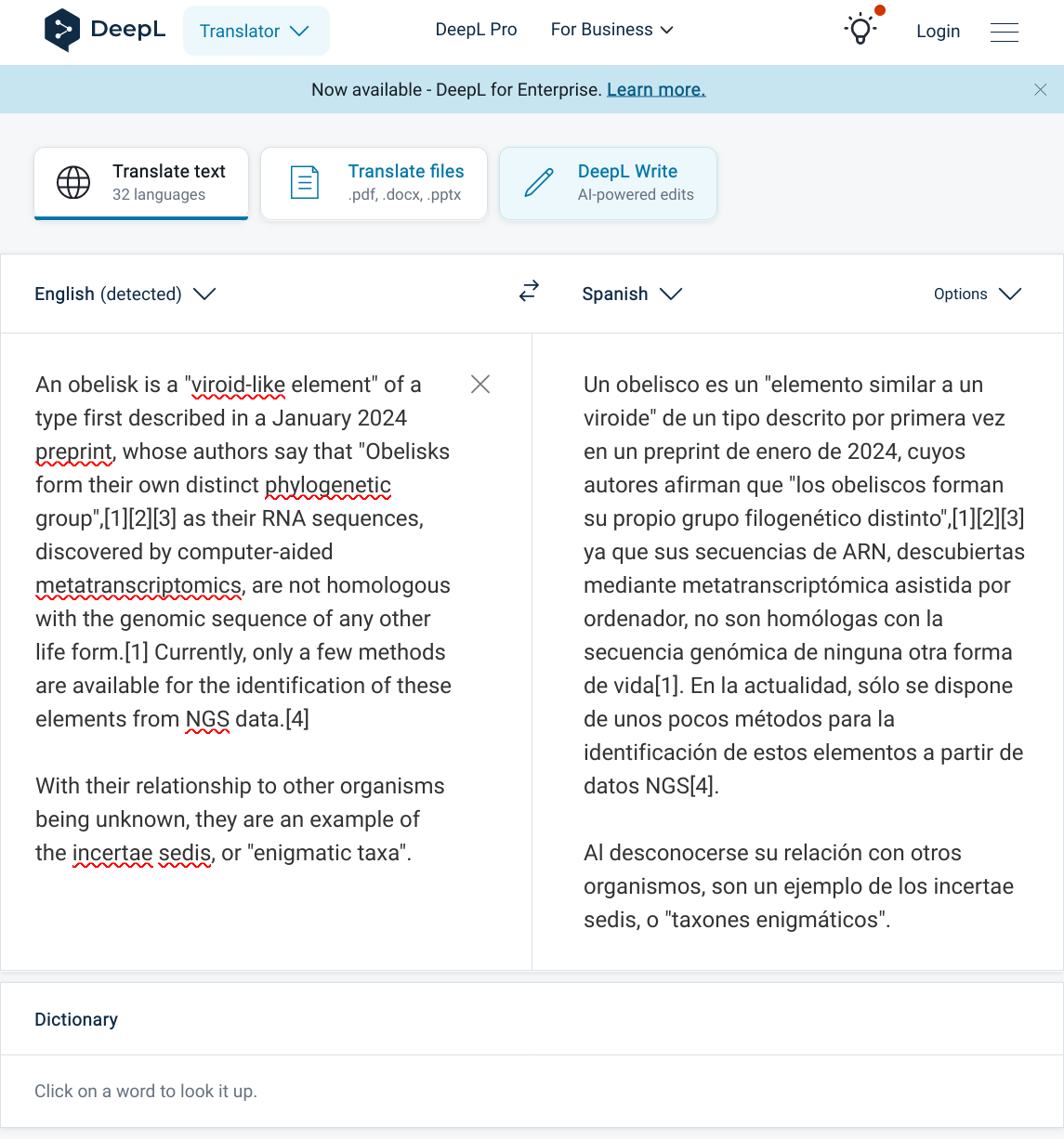
DeepL Translate Web translating an English Wikipedia article to Spanish

=== Translator and subscription ===
The translator can be used for free with a maximum limit of 1,500 characters per translation. Microsoft Word and PowerPoint files in Office Open XML file formats (.docx and .pptx) and PDF files up to 5MB in size can also be translated. It offers paid subscription DeepL Pro, which has been available since March 2018 and includes application programming interface access and a software plug-in for computer-assisted translation tools, including SDL Trados Studio. Unlike the free version, translated texts are stated to not be saved on the server; also, the character limit is removed. The monthly pricing model includes a set amount of text, with texts beyond that being calculated according to the number of characters.

==== Supported languages ====
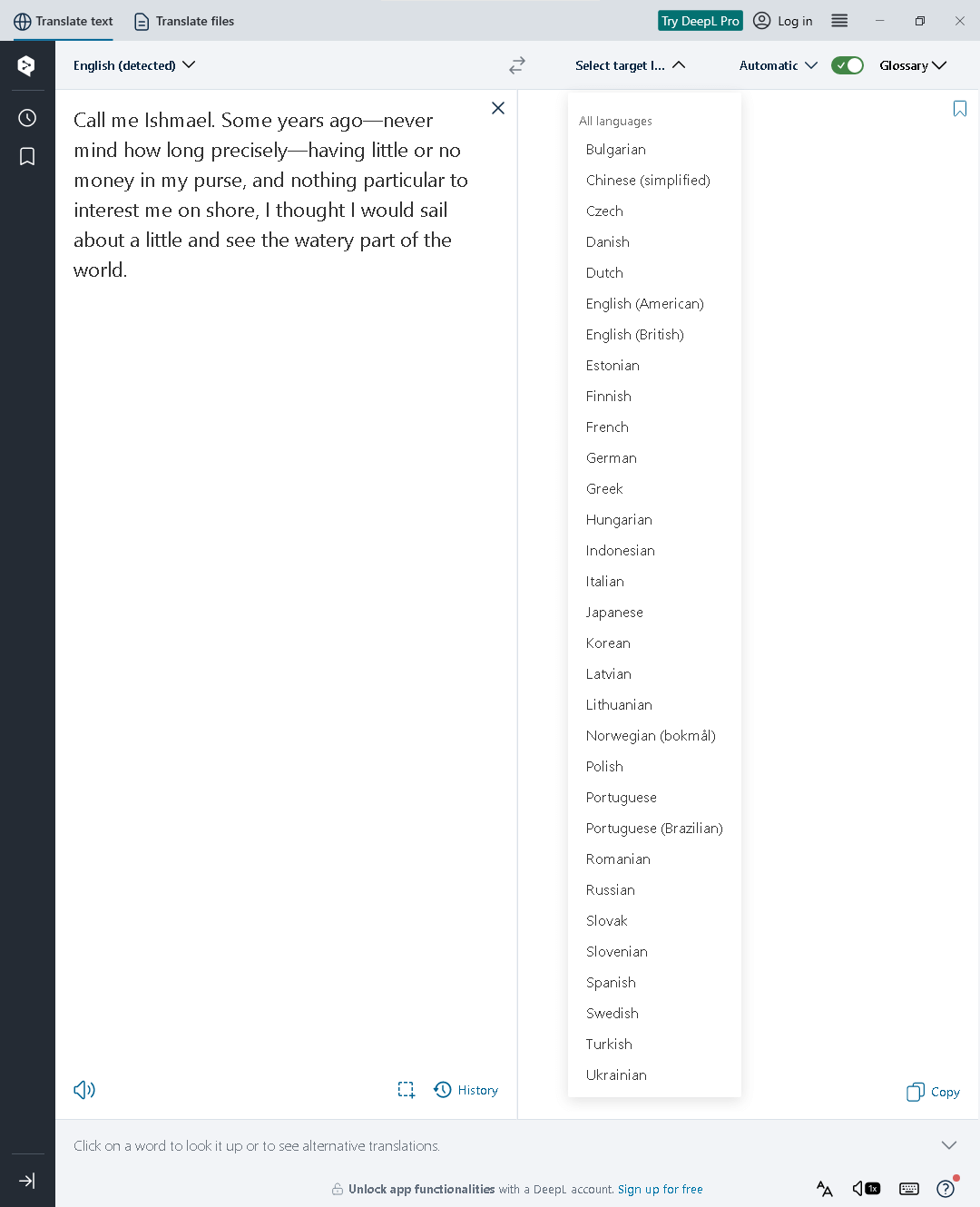
Target languages available in DeepL 23.10.1.11125

As of July 2026, the translation service supports the following languages:

- Acehnese
- Afrikaans
- Albanian
- Arabic
- Aragonese
- Armenian
- Assamese
- Aymara
- Azerbaijani
- Bashkir
- Basque
- Belarusian
- Bengali
- Bhojpuri
- Bosnian
- Breton
- Bulgarian
- Burmese
- Cantonese
- Catalan
- Cebuano
- Chinese (simplified and traditional)
- Croatian
- Czech
- Danish
- Dari
- Dutch
- English (American and British)
- Esperanto
- Estonian
- Finnish
- French (Canadian and France)
- Galician
- Georgian
- German (Germany and Swiss)
- Greek
- Guarani
- Gujarati
- Haitian Creole
- Hausa
- Hebrew
- Hindi
- Hungarian
- Icelandic
- Igbo
- Indonesian
- Irish
- Italian
- Japanese
- Javanese
- Kapampangan
- Kazakh
- Konkani
- Korean
- Kurdish (Kurmanji)
- Kurdish (Sorani)
- Kyrgyz
- Latin
- Latvian
- Lingala
- Lithuanian
- Lombard
- Luxembourgish
- Macedonian
- Maithili
- Malagasy
- Malay
- Malayalam
- Maltese
- Maori
- Marathi
- Mongolian
- Nepali
- Norwegian Bokmål
- Occitan
- Oromo
- Pangasinan
- Pashto
- Persian
- Polish
- Portuguese (Brazilian and European)
- Punjabi
- Quechua
- Romanian
- Russian
- Sanskrit
- Serbian
- Sesotho
- Sicilian
- Slovak
- Slovenian
- Spanish (Latin American and European)
- Sundanese
- Swahili
- Swedish
- Tagalog
- Tajik
- Tamil
- Tatar
- Telugu
- Thai (Note: API only.)
- Tsonga
- Tswana
- Turkish
- Turkmen
- Ukrainian
- Urdu
- Uzbek
- Vietnamese
- Welsh
- Wolof
- Xhosa
- Yiddish
- Zulu

=== DeepL Write ===
In November 2022, DeepL launched a tool to improve monolingual texts in English and German, called DeepL Write. The public beta version was then released on January 17, 2023. In the summer of 2024, DeepL announced the availability of two more languages in DeepL Write: French and Spanish. By January 2024, DeepL had added an additional two: Portuguese (European and Brazilian) and Italian.

=== DeepL Voice ===
DeepL Voice, a real-time speech translation product, launched in November 2024. It includes DeepL Voice for Meetings, offered as add-ons for Microsoft Teams and Zoom that render translated speech as on-screen captions, and DeepL Voice for Conversations, a mobile tool for in-person live discussions. In April 2026, DeepL introduced voice-to-voice translation in more than 40 languages, extending the product to spoken output; the system uses a speech-to-text-to-speech pipeline.

=== DeepL Agent ===
In November 2025, DeepL launched an AI agent called DeepL Agent which is capable of operating business applications in a human-like manner.

== Reception ==
The reception of DeepL has been generally positive.

- TechCrunch appreciates it for the accuracy of its translations and stating that it was more accurate and nuanced than Google Translate.
- Le Monde thanks its developers for translating French text into more "French-sounding" expressions.
- RTL Z stated that DeepL Translator "offers better translations […] when it comes to Dutch to English and vice versa".
- La Repubblica, and a Latin American website, "WWWhat's new?", showed praise as well.
- A 2018 paper by the University of Bologna evaluated the Italian-to-German translation capabilities and found the preliminary results to be similar in quality to Google Translate.
- In September 2021, Slator remarked that the language industry response was more measured than the press and noted that DeepL is still highly regarded by users.

A reviewer noted in 2018 that DeepL had far fewer languages available for translation than competing products.

A 2025 research paper introducing the WMT24++ benchmark, which expanded evaluation to 55 languages and dialects, found that frontier large language models, including OpenAI's o1, Anthropic's Claude and Google's Gemini, ranked above traditional machine-translation systems such as DeepL, Google Translate and Microsoft Translator across the languages tested. The authors noted the rankings were based on automatic metrics and that human evaluation remained future work.

== Awards and honors ==
DeepL won the 2020 Webby Award for Best Practices and the 2020 Webby Award for Technical Achievement (Apps, Mobile, and Features), both in the category Apps, Mobile & Voice. In April 2025, DeepL was featured in the Forbes AI 50 list.

== See also ==
- Comparison of machine translation applications

== Bibliography ==
- Heiss, Christine; Soffritti, Marcello (2018). "DeepL Traduttore e didattica della traduzione dall'italiano in tedesco: Alcune valutazioni preliminari" [DeepL Translator and Didactics of Translation from Italian into German: Some Preliminary Assessments] (in Italian). University of Bologna, Italy: InTRAlinea.org.
