= Moses for Mere Mortals =

Moses for Mere Mortals (MMM) is a free open source software composed of a set of scripts designed to allow the automation of processes for the installation and operation of the Moses Open Source Translation System, a statistical machine translation system.

MMM builds a translation chain prototype with Moses + IRSTLM + RandLM + MGIZA.

The first version of Moses for Mere Mortals was published in November 2009, and it has been updated and tested on Linux - Ubuntu distributions. MMM is available in the GitHub Project Hosting website.

== Overview ==
Its main aims are to:

- help build a prototype of a translation chain for the real world;
- guide the first steps of users that are just beginning to use Moses;
- enable a simple and quick evaluation of Moses;
- enable the user to do his/her own translations without having to trust third (translating) parties;
- integrate machine translation and translation memories.

Even though the main thrust is centred on Linux, two Windows add-ins help to make the bridge from Windows to Linux and then back from Linux.

== General features ==
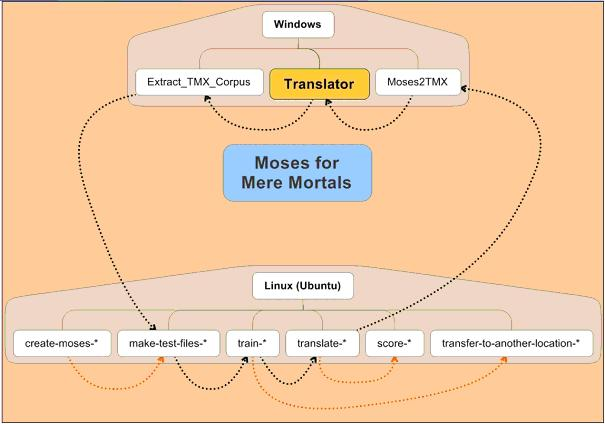
Overview

Moses allows the training of corpora where every word is presented together with, for instance, its respective lemma and/or part of speech tag (“factored training”). The scripts do not cover this type of training.

MMM consists of seven scripts for Linux, thoroughly tested with Ubuntu (12.04 and 14.04, 64-bit):

- Install: To install in Ubuntu the packages on which both Moses and Moses for Mere Mortals depend.
- Create: To compile Moses and the other required packages with a single command.
- Make-test-files: To extract from the original corpus a corpus for training, files for tuning and files for testing the training results.
- Train: To train the language pairs needed, as Moses is language-independent and can work with any language/alphabet.
- Translate: To produce machine translations of new documents.
- Score: To automatically evaluate Moses translations against a human translation taken as a gold standard, using BLEU and NIST metrics algorithms, in order to have an idea of the level of performance.
- Transfer training-to-another-location: To transfer engines/trainings to other folders in the same computer or to a different computer.

MMM comes with a 200,000-segment demonstration corpus — which is too small to do justice to the qualitative results achievable with Moses, but capable of giving a realistic view of the relative duration of the steps involved and useful to test whether the installation was correctly done. In order to get good results, one generally needs a corpus with several million segments. Each orthogonal corpus consists of two strictly aligned UTF-8 files, one in the source language and the other in the target language. No grammar knowledge is required, though some language pairs give better results than others. In a general way, morphologically rich languages give worse results.

== Add-ins ==
MMM also contains (for Windows and Linux):

- Extract_TMX_Corpus: An application for the conversion of one or more files in TMX format into two parallel and perfectly aligned files (in the source and target languages) needed for the training of a language pair.
- Moses2TMX: An application to align originals and Moses translations and to package each file in a TMX file with specific attributes so that Moses translations are identified as MT and as having been translated by Moses and can be used with a translation memory tool, with a penalty relative to human memories.

MMM also contains the file Nonbreaking_prefix.pt, a list of abbreviations specific to the Portuguese language, based on English and German versions already available with the Moses package.

== Software features ==
Moses for Mere Mortals also has some original features:

- It removes control characters from the input files (these can crash a training);
- From the corpus, it extracts 2 training files, 2 tuning files and 2 test files (one in the source language and one in the target language) with randomly selected, non-consecutive segments that are erased from the corpus files;
- A new training does not interfere with the files of a previous training;
- A new training reuses, as much as possible, the files created in previous trainings (thus saving time);
- It stops with an informative message if any of the phases of training (language model building, recaser training, corpus training, memory mapping, tuning or training test) doesn’t produce the expected results;
- It can limit the duration of tuning to a specified number of iterations;
- It can generate, in a single step, the BLEU and NIST scores for one translation or a set of translations present in a directory (either for each whole document or for each segment of each document);
- It allows the transfer of corpus trainings to another computer or to another installation in the same computer;
- It allows the mkcls, GIZA and MGIZA parameters to be controlled through parameters in the train script;
- It allows selected parameters in the Moses scripts and the Moses decoder to be controlled through the train and translate scripts.
