= Parallel text =

Text placed alongside its translation or translations

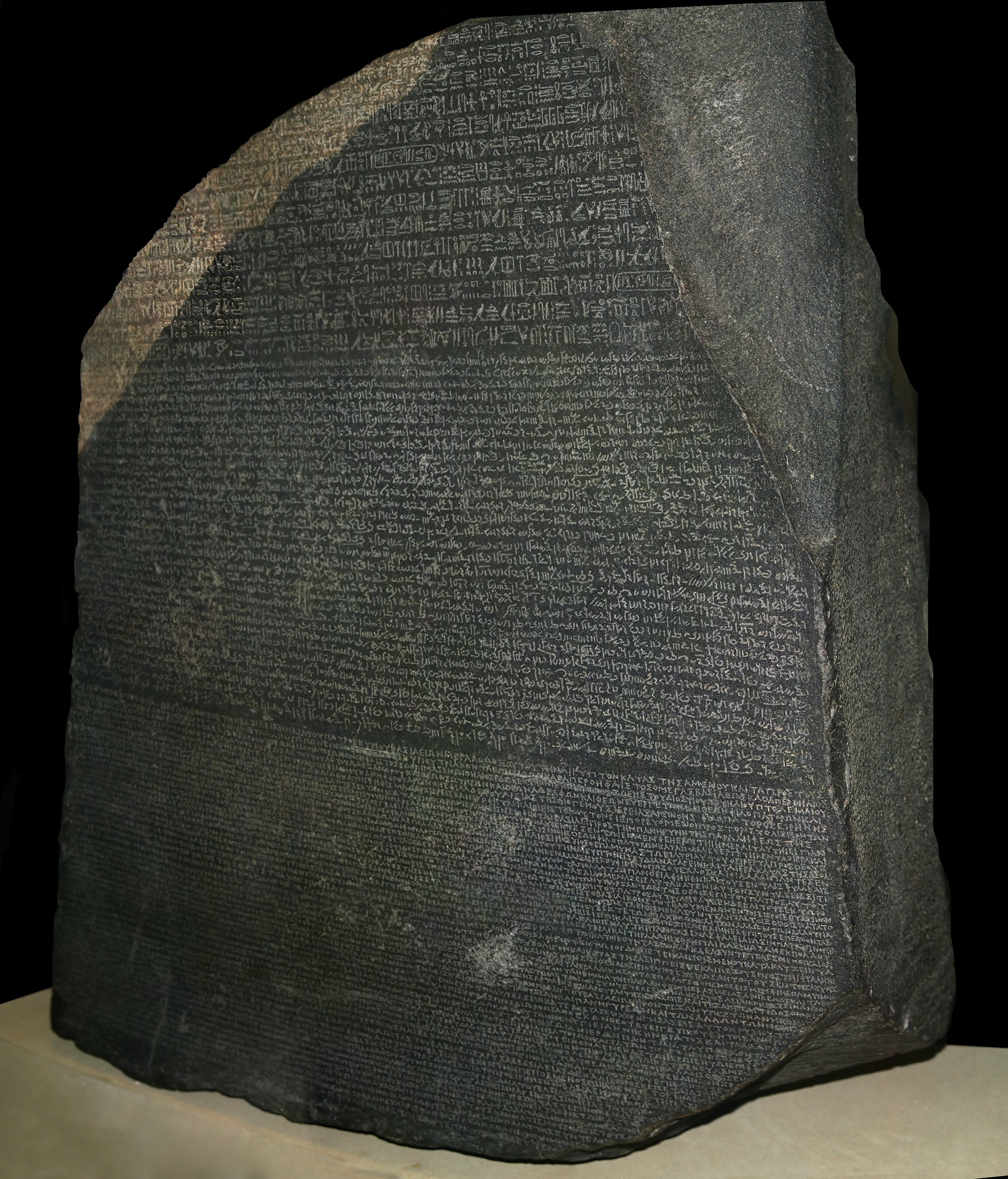
The Rosetta Stone, a stele engraved with the same decree in both of the Ancient Egyptian scripts as well as Ancient Greek. Its discovery was key to deciphering the Ancient Egyptian language.

A parallel text is a text placed alongside its translation or translations. Parallel text alignment is the identification of the corresponding sentences in both halves of the parallel text. The Loeb Classical Library and the Clay Sanskrit Library are two examples of dual-language series of texts. Reference Bibles may contain the original languages and a translation, or several translations by themselves, for ease of comparison and study; Origen's Hexapla (Greek for "sixfold") placed six versions of the Old Testament side by side. A famous example is the Rosetta Stone, whose discovery allowed the Ancient Egyptian language to begin being deciphered.

Large collections of parallel texts are called parallel corpora (see text corpus). Alignments of parallel corpora at sentence level are prerequisite for many areas of linguistic research. During translation, sentences can be split, merged, deleted, inserted or reordered by the translator. This makes alignment a non-trivial task.

Parallel texts may be used in language education.

== Types of parallel corpora ==
Parallel corpora can be classified into four main categories:

- A parallel corpus contains translations of the same document in two or more languages, aligned at least at the sentence level. These tend to be rarer than less-comparable corpora.
- A noisy parallel corpus contains bilingual sentences that are not perfectly aligned or have poor quality translations. Nevertheless, most of its contents are bilingual translations of a specific document.
- A comparable corpus is built from non-sentence-aligned and untranslated bilingual documents, but the documents are topic-aligned.
- A quasi-comparable corpus includes very heterogeneous and non-parallel bilingual documents that may or may not be topic-aligned.

== Noise in corpora ==
Large corpora used as training sets for machine translation algorithms are usually extracted from large bodies of similar sources, such as databases of news articles written in the first and second languages describing similar events.

However, extracted fragments may be noisy, with extra elements inserted in each corpus. Extraction techniques can differentiate between bilingual elements represented in both corpora and monolingual elements represented in only one corpus in order to extract cleaner parallel fragments of bilingual elements. Comparable corpora are used to directly obtain knowledge for translation purposes. High-quality parallel data is difficult to obtain, however, especially for under-resourced languages.

== Bitext ==
In the field of translation studies a bitext is a merged document composed of both source- and target-language versions of a given text.

Bitexts are generated by a piece of software called an alignment tool, or a bitext tool, which automatically aligns the original and translated versions of the same text. The tool generally matches these two texts sentence by sentence. A collection of bitexts is called a bitext database or a bilingual corpus, and can be consulted with a search tool.

=== Bitexts and translation memories ===
Bitexts have some similarities with translation memories. The most salient difference is that a translation memory loses the original context, while a bitext retains the original sentence order. That said, some implementations of translation memory, such as Translation Memory eXchange (TMX), a standard XML format for exchanging translation memories between computer-assisted translation (CAT) programs, allow preserving the original order of sentences.

Bitexts are designed to be consulted by a human translator, not by a machine. As such, small alignment errors or minor discrepancies that would cause a translation memory to fail are of no importance.

In his original 1988 article, Harris also posited that bitext represents how translators hold their source and target texts together in their mental working memories as they progress. However, this hypothesis has not been followed up.

Online bitexts and translation memories may also be called online bilingual concordances. Several are available on the public Web, including Linguée, Reverso, and Tradooit.

== See also ==
- Bilingual inscription
- Computer-assisted reviewing
- Example-based machine translation
- Interlinear gloss
- Natural language processing
- Polyglot (book)
- Ruby character
- Statistical machine translation
