= Browser hijacking =

Form of unwanted software

Browser hijacking is a form of unwanted software that modifies a web browser's settings without a user's permission, to inject unwanted advertising into the user's browser. A browser hijacker may replace the existing home page, error page, or search engine with its own. These are generally used to force hits to a particular website, increasing its advertising revenue. A 2015 study presented at the IEEE Symposium on Security and Privacy found that ad injection affected more than 5% of the unique IP addresses accessing Google each day, or tens of millions of users. Injected ads reached users through Chrome extensions and Windows programs.

Some browser hijackers also contain spyware, for example, some install a software keylogger to gather information such as banking and e-mail authentication details. Some browser hijackers can also damage the registry on Windows systems, often permanently.

While some browser hijacking can be easily reversed, other instances may be difficult to reverse. Various software packages exist to prevent such modification.

Many browser hijacking programs are included in software bundles that the user did not choose and are included as "offers" in the installer for another program, often included with no uninstall instructions, or documentation on what they do, and are presented in a way that is designed to be confusing for the average user, to trick them into installing unwanted extra software. A 2016 study by Google and New York University researchers, covering four large commercial pay-per-install networks, found that browser settings hijackers were among the main types of software paying for installs through bundling, together with ad injectors and "cleanup" utilities.

There are several methods that browser hijackers use to gain entry to an operating system. Email attachments and files downloaded through suspicious websites and torrents are common tactics that browser hijackers use.

== Security ==
=== Rogue security software ===
Some rogue security software will also hijack the start page, generally displaying a message such as "WARNING! Your computer is infected with spyware!" to lead to an antispyware vendor's page. The start page will return to normal settings once the user buys their software. Programs such as WinFixer are known to hijack the user's start page and redirect it to another website.

=== Non-existent domain pages ===
The Domain Name System is queried when a user types in the name of a website (e.g., wikipedia.org) and the DNS returns the IP address of the website if it exists. If a user mistypes the name of a website then the DNS will return a Non-Existent Domain (NXDOMAIN) response.

Historically, some Internet Service Providers (ISPs) like EarthLink in 2006 intercepted NXDOMAIN responses at the server level to redirect users to ad-heavy search pages, sparking significant privacy concerns.[6] On modern networks, this practice has largely declined due to widespread adoption of encrypted DNS protocols (such as DoH and DoT) and browser-level error handling, which prevent ISPs from tampering with unresolved domain queries.

=== Operation ===
Unwanted programs often include no sign that they are installed, and no uninstall or opt-out instructions.

Most hijacking programs constantly change the settings of browsers, meaning that user choices in their own browser are overwritten. Some antivirus software identifies browser hijacking software as malicious software and can remove it. Some spyware scanning programs have a browser restore function to set the user's browser settings back to normal or alert them when their browser page has been changed.

== Avoidance ==
As of Microsoft Windows 10, web browsers can no longer set themselves as a user's default without further intervention; changing the default web browser must be performed manually by the user from Settings' "Default apps" page, ostensibly to prevent browser hijacking.

== Examples of hijackers ==
A number of hijackers change the browser homepage, display adverts, and/or set the default search engine; these include Astromenda (www.astromenda.com); Ask Toolbar (ask.com); ESurf (esurf.biz) Binkiland (binkiland.com); Delta and Claro; Dregol; Jamenize; Mindspark; Groovorio; Sweet Page; Mazy Search; Pensirot; Search Protect by Conduit along with search.conduit.com and variants; Tuvaro; Spigot; en.4yendex.com; Yahoo; etc.

=== Babylon Toolbar ===
Babylon Toolbar is a browser hijacker that will change the browser homepage and set the default search engine to isearch.babylon.com. It is also a form of adware. It displays advertisements, sponsored links, and spurious paid search results. The program will also collect search terms from search queries.

Babylon's translation software prompts to add the Babylon Toolbar on installation. The toolbar also comes bundled as an add-on with other software downloads.

In 2011, the CNet site Download.com started bundling the Babylon Toolbar with open-source packages such as Nmap. Gordon Lyon, the developer of Nmap, was upset over the way users of his software were tricked into using the toolbar. The vice-president of Download.com, Sean Murphy, released an apology: The bundling of this software was a mistake on our part and we apologize to the user and developer communities for the unrest it caused.

Similar variants of the Babylon toolbar and search homepage exist including: Bueno Search, Delta Search, Claro Search, and Search GOL. All of these variants state to be owned by Babylon in the terms of service.

All of the toolbars were created by Montiera.

=== Conduit (Search Protect) ===
Conduit is a hijacker that steals personal and confidential information from the user and transfers it to a third party. This toolbar has been identified as Potentially Unwanted Programs (PUPs) by Malwarebytes and is typically bundled with free downloads. These toolbars modify the browser's default search engine, homepage, new tab page, and several other browser settings. There are similar variants of conduit search such as trovi.com, trovigo.com, better-search.net, seekforsearch.com, searchitdown.com, need4search.com, clearsearches.com, search-armor.com, searchthatup.com, premiumsearchweb.com, along with other variants which were created in a customized way for the toolbar creation service Conduit Ltd used to offer.

A program called "Conduit Search Protect", better known as "Search Protect by conduit", can cause severe system errors upon uninstallation. It claims to protect browser settings but actually attempts to block changes to the malicious settings. Search Protect has an option to change the search homepage from the "recommended" search home page Trovi, but users have reported it changing back to Trovi after a period of time. The uninstall program for Search Protect can cause Windows to be unbootable because the uninstall file not only removes its own files, but also all the boot files in the root of the C: drive. and leaves a BackGroundContainer.dll file in the start-up registry. Conduit is associated with malware, spyware, and adware, as victims of this hijacker have reported unwanted pop-ups and embedded in-text advertisements, on sites without ads.

Perion Network Ltd. acquired Conduit's ClientConnect business in early January 2014, and later partnered with Lenovo to create Lenovo Browser Guard, which uses components of Search Protect.

Victims of unwanted redirections to conduit.com have also reported that they have been attacked by phishing attempts and have received unwanted junk mail, telephone calls from telemarketers, and other spam. Some victims claim that the callers claimed to be Apple, Microsoft, or their ISP, and are told that personal information was used in some phone calls, and that some of the calls concerned their browsing habits and recent browsing history. Personal information harvested by such spyware is frequently leveraged in highly targeted social engineering and phishing campaigns.

=== istartsurf.com ===
The browser hijacker istartsurf.com may replace the preferred search tools. This infection travels bundled with third-party applications and its installation may be silent. Due to this, affected users are not aware that the hijacker has infected their Internet Explorer, Google Chrome or Mozilla Firefox browsers.

=== Search-daily.com ===
Search-daily.com is a hijacker that may be downloaded by the Zlob trojan. It redirects the user's searches to pornography sites. It is also known to slow down computer performance.

=== Snap.do ===
Snap.do (Smartbar developed by Resoft) is potential malware, categorized as a browser hijacker and spyware, that causes web browsers to redirect to the snap.do search engine. Snap.Do can be manually downloaded from the Resoft website, though most users are entrapped due to it being bundled with other software and installed unintentionally. It affects Windows and can be removed through the Add/Remove program menu. Snap.Do also can download many malicious toolbars, add-ons, and plug-ins like DVDVideoSoftTB, General Crawler, and Save Valet.

General Crawler, installed by Snap.do, has been known to use a backdoor process to re-install and re-enable itself every time an affected user removes it through their browser(s) or through Windows' built-in uninstaller.

Snap.do will disable the option to change your homepage and default search engine.

Resoft will track the following information:

- The Internet domain and IP address from which the user accesses the Resoft Products (location, ID, etc.)
- Screen resolution of the user's computer monitor (display)
- The date and time the user intentionally or unintentionally accesses Resoft products
- The pages the user is visiting with the Resoft Products (with or without knowledge of using Resoft products, Snap.do)
- If the user willingly or unwillingly linked to a Resoft website from another referring website, the address of that site

=== SourceForge Installer ===
A previous installer of SourceForge included adware and PUP installers.

One particular one changes the browser settings of Firefox, Chrome, and Internet Explorer to show the website "istartsurf.com" as the homepage. It does so by changing registry settings and reverting the settings if the user tries to change them.

On June 1, 2015, SourceForge claimed that they stopped coupling "third party offers" with unmaintained SourceForge projects.

=== Superfish VisualDiscovery ===
VisualDiscovery, developed by Superfish, Inc., was ad-injecting software that Lenovo preinstalled on hundreds of thousands of consumer laptops sold in the United States from August 2014. To show pop-up ads from retail partners, it sat as a "man-in-the-middle" between users' browsers and the websites they visited, including encrypted sites. The Federal Trade Commission (FTC) alleged that the software replaced websites' digital certificates with its own without adequately checking that they were valid. As a result, browsers could not warn users about spoofed or malicious sites. In September 2017 Lenovo settled charges brought by the FTC and 32 state attorneys general. The settlement requires Lenovo to obtain consumers' affirmative consent before preinstalling such software.

=== Trojan.WinLNK.Agent ===
A Trojan.WinLNK.Agent (also Trojan:Win32/Startpage.OS) is the definition from Kaspersky Labs of a Trojan downloader, Trojan dropper, or Trojan spy. Its first known detection goes back to May 31, 2011, according to Microsoft Malware Protection Center. This Trojanware opens up an Internet Explorer browser to a predefined page (like to i.163vv.com/?96). Trojan Files with the LNK extension (expression) is a Windows shortcut to a malicious file, program, or folder. A LNK file of this family launches a malicious executable or may be dropped by other malware. These files are mostly used by worms to spread via USB drives (i.e.). In 2016, India had the most incidents relating to this Trojan with 18,36 % worldwide.

Other aliases:

- Win32/StartPage.NZQ (ESET)
- Trojan.WinLNK.Startpage (Kaspersky Labs)
- Trojan:Win32/Startpage.OS (Microsoft)

Other variants:

- Trojan.WinLNK.Agent.ae
- Trojan.WinLNK.Agent.ew

=== Vosteran ===
Vosteran is a browser hijacker that changes a browser's home page and default search provider to vosteran.com. This infection is essentially bundled with other third-party applications. The identity of Vosteran is protected by privacyprotect.org from Australia. Vosteran is registered through Whiteknight.

=== Trovi ===
Trovi is a browser hijacker typically distributed through third-party download portals (such as Download.com) and legacy freeware repositories. These platforms frequently bundle unwanted software into the installers of otherwise legitimate open-source or freeware applications without the original developers' consent.

Trovi uses Bing (a legitimate search engine) to provide results to the user. Although the address bar changes to Bing.com when showing search results, search keywords are executed through Trovi regardless. Trovi formerly used its own website to show search results with the logo at the top left hand corner of the page but later switched to Bing in attempt to fool users more easily. Trovi is not as deadly as before with taking the ads out of the search results depending on what browser is being used, but is still considered a browser hijacker.

It also controls the homepage and new tab page settings to prohibit the ability to change them back to the original settings. Depending on whatever browser is being used, ads may appear on the page.

When it infects a user's computer, it makes a browser redirect from Google and some other search engines to trovi.com.

Trovi was created using the Conduit toolbar creation service and has known to infect in similar ways to the Conduit toolbar.
