= Neural machine translation =

Machine translation using artificial neural networks

Neural machine translation (NMT) is an approach to machine translation that uses an artificial neural network to predict the likelihood of a sequence of words, typically predicting entire sentences in a single integrated model, however could predict larger sequences, depending on the sophistication of the system architecture.

It is the dominant approach in machine translation today and can output predictions that rival human translations when transcribing between high-resource languages under specific conditions. However, there still remain challenges in NMT, particularly with languages that have less available virtual resources, and also in domain adaptation, where NMTs for certain languages may struggle to be applied for others. NMT systems tend to produce literal translations, so semantics may become lost or misconstrued during translation.

== Overview ==
In the translation task, a sentence $\mathbf{x} = x_{1,I}$ (consisting of $I$ tokens $x_i$) in the source language is to be translated into a sentence $\mathbf{y} = x_{1,J}$ (consisting of $J$ tokens $x_j$) in the target language. The source and target tokens are then converted into vectors, where they can be processed mathematically.

NMT models assign a probability $P(y|x)$ to potential translations y and then search a subset of potential translations for the one with the highest probability. Most NMT models are auto-regressive, meaning they calculate the probability of each target token as a function of the both source sentence and the previous target tokens. The probability of the whole translation is consequently the product of the probabilities of the individual predicted tokens:

$$P(y|x) = \prod_{j=1}^{J} P(y_j | y_{1,i-1}, \mathbf{x})$$

NMT models differ in how exactly they model the function $P$, but most use some variation of the encoder-decoder architecture: They first use an encoder network to process $\mathbf{x}$ , and encode it into a vector (or matrix) representation of the source sentence. The model will then use a decoder network that usually produces one target word at a time, taking into account the source representation, and the tokens it has produced thus far. As soon as the decoder produces a special, end-of-sentence token, the decoding process is terminated.

== History ==
=== Early approaches ===
In 1987, Robert B. Allen demonstrated the use of feed-forward neural networks for translating auto-generated English sentences with a limited vocabulary of 31 words into Spanish. In this experiment, the sizes of the network's input and output layers were elected to be just large enough for the longest sentences in the source and target language, respectively, because the network lacked the tools to encode sequences of arbitrary length into fixed-size representation. In his summary, Allen also already hinted at the possibility of using auto-associative models, one for encoding the source, and one for decoding the target.

Lonnie Chrisman built upon Allen's work in 1991, by training separate recursive auto-associative memory (RAAM) networks (developed by Jordan B. Pollack) for the source and the target language. Each of the RAAM networks were trained to encode an arbitrary-length sentence into a fixed-size, hidden representation and to decode the original sentence again from that representation. Additionally, the two networks were also trained to share their hidden representation, so the source encoder could produce a representation that the target decoder can rapidly re-translate. Forcada and Ñeco simplified this procedure in 1997 to directly train a source encoder and a target decoder in what they called a recursive hetero-associative memory (RHAM).

Futhermore, in 1997, Castaño and Casacuberta employed an Elman's recurrent neural network in another machine translation task with very limited vocabulary and complexity.

Even though these early approaches begin to resemble modern NMT, the computing resources of the time were insufficient in predicting large text datasets. Instead, other methods like Statistical machine translation (SMT) became the benchmark procedure of computational translation during the late 1990s, to the early 2000s.

=== Hybrid approaches ===
During the time when Statistical machine translation was prevalent, some computer scientists used neural frameworks to replace various routines in the statistical machine translation, while still using the log-linear approach to hybridise the systems. For example, in various systems alongside various researchers, Holger Schwenk replaced the status-quo n-gram language model with a neural model in combination with estimated phrase translation probabilities, using a feed-forward network.

=== seq2seq ===
In 2013 and 2014, end-to-end neural machine translation had its breakthrough with Kalchbrenner & Blunsom's convolutional neural network (CNN), used for encoding the source and both Cho et al., and Sutskever's et al. recurrent neural network (RNN) for sequential analysis. All three groups utilised an RNN conditioned on a fixed encoding of the source as their decoder, in order to produce the translation. However, these models performed poorly on longer sentences. This problem was addressed when Bahdanau et al. introduced the mechanism of attention to their encoder-decoder architecture. At each decoding step, the state of the decoder is used to calculate a source representation that focuses on different parts of the source and uses that representation in the calculation of the probabilities for the next token. Based on these RNN-based architectures, Baidu launched the "first large-scale NMT system" in 2015, followed by the Google Neural Machine Translation in 2016. From that year on, neural models also became the prevailing option in the Machine translation conference on Statistical machine translation.

Gehring et al. combined a CNN encoder with an attention mechanism in 2017, which handled long-range dependencies in the source better than previous approaches, and also increased translation speed due to a CNN's encoder being parallelizable, whereas an RNN encoder can only encode one token at a time. In the same year, Microsoft Translator released their own, online neural machine translation (NMT). DeepL Translator, which, at the time, was based on a CNN encoder, was also released in the same year and was backed by many media outlets to outperform its competitors. It has also been seen that OpenAI's GPT-3 released in 2020 can function as a neural machine translation system. Some other machine translation systems, such as Microsoft translator and SYSTRAN can be also seen to have integrated neural networks into their operations.

=== Transformer ===
Another network architecture that lends itself to parallelization is the transformer, introduced by Vaswani et al. in 2017. Like previous models, the transformer still uses the attention mechanism for weighting encoder output for the decoding steps. However, the transformer's encoder and decoder networks themselves are also based on attention instead of recurrence or convolution: Each layer weighs and transforms the previous layer's output in a process called self-attention. Since the attention mechanism does not have any notion of token order, but the order of words in a sentence is obviously relevant, the token embeddings are combined with an explicit encoding of their position in the sentence. Since both the transformer's encoder and decoder are free from recurrent elements, they can both be parallelized during training. However, the original transformer's decoder is still auto-regressive, which means that decoding still has to be done one token at a time during inference.

The transformer model quickly became the dominant choice for machine translation systems and was still the most-used format of NMT at the machine translation conference workshop in 2022 and 2023.

Usually, NMT models’ weights are initialized randomly and then refined by training on parallel datasets. However, since using large language models (LLMs) such as BERT, neural models pre-trained on large amounts of monolingual data as a starting point for learning other tasks, has proven very successful. This is especially useful for low-resource languages, where large parallel datasets do not exist. An example of this is the mBART model, which first trains one transformer on a multilingual dataset to recover masked tokens in sentences, and then fine-tunes the resulting autoencoder on the translation task.

==== Generative LLMs ====
Instead of fine-tuning a pre-trained language model on the translation task, sufficiently large generative models can also be directly prompted to translate a sentence into the desired language. This approach was first comprehensively tested for and evaluated in GPT 3.5, by Hendy et al. (2023), who found that GPT systems can produce highly fluent and competitive translation outputs even in the zero-shot setting - especially for the high-resource language translations.

The 2023 Conference on Machine Translation tested a variety of LLMs for their translation capabilities and found that machine translations were almost all on par with manual translation.

== Comparison with statistical machine translation ==
NMT has overcome several challenges that were present in statistical machine translation (SMT):

- NMT's full reliance on continuous representation of tokens overcame sparsity issues caused by rare words or phrases. Models were able to generalize more effectively.
- The limited n-gram length used in SMT's n-gram language models caused a loss of context. NMT systems overcome this through not having a hard cut-off after a fixed number of tokens, and also through attention mechanisms which aid in selecting which tokens to focus on when generating the next.
- End-to-end training of a single model improved translation performance and also simplified the whole process.
- The huge n-gram models (up to 7-gram) used in SMT required large amounts of memory, whereas NMT uses memory far more efficiently.

== Training procedure ==
=== Cross-entropy loss ===
NMT models are usually trained to maximize the likelihood of observing the training data i.e., for a dataset of $T$ source sentences $X = \mathbf{x}^{(1)}, ..., \mathbf{x}^{(T)}$ and corresponding target sentences $Y = \mathbf{y}^{(1)}, ..., \mathbf{y}^{(T)}$, the goal is finding the model parameters $\theta^*$ that maximize the sum of the likelihood of each target sentence in the training data given the corresponding source sentence:

$$\theta^* = \underset{\theta}{\operatorname{arg\,max}} \sum_i^T P_{\theta}(\mathbf{y}^{(i)}|\mathbf{x}^{(i)})$$

Expanding to token level yields:

$$\theta^* = \underset{\theta}{\operatorname{arg\,max}} \sum_i^T \prod_{j=1}^{J^{(i)}} P(y_j^{(i)} | y_{1,j-1}^{(i)}, \mathbf{x}^{(i)})$$

Since we are only interested in the maximum, we can just as well search for the maximum of the logarithm instead (which has the advantage that it avoids floating point underflow that could happen with the product of low probabilities).

$$\theta^* = \underset{\theta}{\operatorname{arg\,max}} \sum_i^T \log\prod_{j=1}^{J^{(i)}} P(y_j^{(i)} | y_{1,j-1}^{(i)}, \mathbf{x}^{(i)})$$

Using the fact that the logarithm of a product is the sum of the factors’ logarithms and flipping the sign yields the classic cross-entropy loss:

$$\theta^* = \underset{\theta}{\operatorname{arg\,min}} - \sum_i^T \log\sum_{j=1}^{J^{(i)}} P(y_j^{(i)} | y_{1,j-1}^{(i)}, \mathbf{x}^{(i)})$$

In practice, this minimization is done iteratively on small subsets (mini-batches) of the training set using stochastic gradient descent.

=== Teacher forcing ===
During inference, auto-regressive decoders use the token generated in the previous step as the input token. However, the vocabulary of target tokens is usually very large. So, at the beginning of the training phase, untrained models will pick the wrong token almost always; and subsequent steps would then have to work with wrong input tokens, which would slow down training considerably. Instead, teacher forcing is used during the training phase: The model (the “student” in the teacher forcing metaphor) is always fed the previous ground-truth tokens as input for the next token, regardless of what it predicted in the previous step.

== Translation by prompt engineering LLMs ==
As outlined in the history section above, instead of using an NMT system that is trained on parallel text, one can also prompt a generative LLM to translate a text. These models differ from an encoder-decoder NMT system in a number of ways:

- Generative language models are not trained on the translation task, let alone on a parallel dataset. Instead, they are trained on a language modeling objective, such as predicting the next word in a sequence drawn from a large dataset of text. This dataset can contain documents in many languages, but is in practice dominated by English text. After this pre-training, they are fine-tuned on another task, usually to follow instructions.
- Since they are not trained on translation, they also do not feature an encoder-decoder architecture. Instead, they just consist of a transformer's decoder.
- In order to be competitive on the machine translation task, LLMs need to be much larger than other NMT systems. E.g., GPT-3 has 175 billion parameters, while mBART has 680 million and the original transformer-big has “only” 213 million. This means that they are computationally more expensive to train and use.

A generative LLM can be prompted in a zero-shot fashion by just asking it to translate a text into another language without giving any further examples in the prompt. Or one can include one or several example translations in the prompt before asking to translate the text in question. This is then called one-shot or few-shot learning, respectively. For example, the following prompts were used by Hendy et al. (2023) for zero-shot and one-shot translation:

### Translate this sentence from [source language] to [target language], Source:
[source sentence]
### Target:

Translate this into 1. [target language]:
[shot 1 source]
1. [shot 1 reference]
Translate this into 1. [target language]:
[input]
1.

== Literature ==
- Koehn, Philipp (2020). Neural machine translation. Cambridge University Press. arXiv:1709.07809. doi:10.1017/9781108608480. ISBN 9781108608480.
- Stahlberg, Felix (2019). "Neural Machine Translation: A Review and Survey". arXiv:1912.02047 [cs.CL].

== See also ==
- Attention (machine learning)
- Transformer (machine learning model)
- Seq2seq
