= History of machine translation =

Machine translation is a sub-field of computational linguistics that investigates the use of software to translate text or speech from one natural language to another.

In the 1950s, machine translation became a reality in research, although references to the subject can be found as early as the 17th century. The Georgetown experiment, which involved successful fully automatic translation of more than sixty Russian sentences into English in 1954, was one of the earliest recorded projects. Researchers of the Georgetown experiment asserted their belief that machine translation would be a solved problem within a few years. In the Soviet Union, similar experiments were performed shortly after. Consequently, the success of the experiment ushered in an era of significant funding for machine translation research in the United States. The achieved progress was much slower than expected; in 1966, the ALPAC report found that ten years of research had not fulfilled the expectations of the Georgetown experiment and resulted in dramatically reduced funding.

Interest grew in statistical models for machine translation, which became more common and also less expensive in the 1980s as available computational power increased.

Although there exists no autonomous system of "fully automatic high quality translation of unrestricted text," there are many programs now available that are capable of providing useful output within strict constraints. Several of these programs are available online, such as Google Translate and the SYSTRAN system that powers AltaVista's BabelFish (which was replaced by Microsoft Bing translator in May 2012).

== The beginning ==
The origins of machine translation can be traced back to the work of Al-Kindi, a 9th-century Arabic cryptographer who developed techniques for systemic language translation, including cryptanalysis, frequency analysis, and probability and statistics, which are used in modern machine translation. The idea of machine translation later appeared in the 17th century. In 1629, René Descartes proposed a universal language, with equivalent ideas in different tongues sharing one symbol.

In the mid-1930s the first patents for "translating machines" were applied for by Georges Artsrouni, for an automatic bilingual dictionary using punched tape. Russian Peter Troyanskii submitted a more detailed proposal that included both the bilingual dictionary and a method for dealing with grammatical roles between languages, based on the grammatical system of Esperanto. This system was separated into three stages: stage one consisted of a native-speaking editor in the source language to organize the words into their logical forms and to exercise the syntactic functions; stage two required the machine to "translate" these forms into the target language; and stage three required a native-speaking editor in the target language to normalize this output. Troyanskii's proposal remained unknown until the late 1950s, by which time computers were well-known and utilized.

== The early years ==
The first set of proposals for computer based machine translation was presented in 1949 by Warren Weaver, a researcher at the Rockefeller Foundation, "Translation memorandum". These proposals were based on information theory, successes in code breaking during the Second World War, and theories about the universal principles underlying natural language.

A few years after Weaver submitted his proposals, research began in earnest at many universities in the United States. On 7 January 1954 the Georgetown–IBM experiment was held in New York at the head office of IBM. This was the first public demonstration of a machine translation system. The demonstration was widely reported in the newspapers and garnered public interest. The system itself, however, was no more than a "toy" system. It had only 250 words and translated 49 carefully selected Russian sentences into English – mainly in the field of chemistry. Nevertheless, it encouraged the idea that machine translation was imminent and stimulated the financing of the research, not only in the US but worldwide.

Early systems used large bilingual dictionaries and hand-coded rules for fixing the word order in the final output which was eventually considered too restrictive in linguistic developments at the time. For example, generative linguistics and transformational grammar were exploited to improve the quality of translations. During this period operational systems were installed. The United States Air Force used a system produced by IBM and Washington University in St. Louis, while the Atomic Energy Commission and Euratom, in Italy, used a system developed at Georgetown University. While the quality of the output was poor it met many of the customers' needs, particularly in terms of speed.

At the end of the 1950s, Yehoshua Bar-Hillel was asked by the US government to look into machine translation, to assess the possibility of fully automatic high-quality translation by machines. Bar-Hillel described the problem of semantic ambiguity or double-meaning, as illustrated in the following sentence:

Little John was looking for his toy box. Finally he found it. The box was in the pen.

The word pen may have two meanings: the first meaning, something used to write in ink with; the second meaning, a container of some kind. To a human, the meaning is obvious, but Bar-Hillel claimed that without a "universal encyclopedia" a machine would never be able to deal with this problem. At the time, this type of semantic ambiguity could only be solved by writing source texts for machine translation in a controlled language that uses a vocabulary in which each word has exactly one meaning.

== The 1960s, the ALPAC report and the seventies ==
Research in the 1960s in both the Soviet Union and the United States concentrated mainly on the Russian–English language pair. The objects of translation were chiefly scientific and technical documents, such as articles from scientific journals. The rough translations produced were sufficient to get a basic understanding of the articles. If an article discussed a subject deemed to be confidential, it was sent to a human translator for a complete translation; if not, it was discarded.

A great blow came to machine-translation research in 1966 with the publication of the ALPAC report. The report was commissioned by the US government and delivered by ALPAC, the Automatic Language Processing Advisory Committee, a group of seven scientists convened by the US government in 1964. The US government was concerned that there was a lack of progress being made despite significant expenditure. The report concluded that machine translation was more expensive, less accurate and slower than human translation, and that despite the expenditures, machine translation was not likely to reach the quality of a human translator in the near future.

The report recommended, however, that tools be developed to aid translators – automatic dictionaries, for example – and that some research in computational linguistics should continue to be supported.

The publication of the report had a profound impact on research into machine translation in the United States, and to a lesser extent the Soviet Union and United Kingdom. Research, at least in the US, was almost completely abandoned for over a decade. In Canada, France and Germany, however, research continued. In the US the main exceptions were the founders of SYSTRAN (Peter Toma) and Logos (Bernard Scott), who established their companies in 1968 and 1970 respectively and served the US Department of Defense. In 1970, the SYSTRAN system was installed for the United States Air Force, and subsequently by the Commission of the European Communities in 1976. The METEO System, developed at the Université de Montréal, was installed in Canada in 1977 to translate weather forecasts from English to French, and was translating close to 80,000 words per day or 30 million words per year until it was replaced by a competitor's system on 30 September 2001.

While research in the 1960s concentrated on limited language pairs and input, demand in the 1970s was for low-cost systems that could translate a range of technical and commercial documents. This demand was spurred by the increase of globalisation and the demand for translation in Canada, Europe, and Japan.

== The 1980s and early 1990s ==
By the 1980s, both the diversity and the number of installed systems for machine translation had increased. A number of systems relying on mainframe technology were in use, such as SYSTRAN, Logos, Ariane-G5, and Metal.

As a result of the improved availability of microcomputers, there was a market for lower-end machine translation systems. Many companies took advantage of this in Europe, Japan, and the USA. Systems were also brought onto the market in China, Eastern Europe, Korea, and the Soviet Union.

During the 1980s there was a lot of activity in MT in Japan especially. With the fifth-generation computer, Japan intended to leap over its competition in computer hardware and software, and one project that many large Japanese electronics firms found themselves involved in was creating software for translating into and from English (Fujitsu, Toshiba, NTT, Brother, Catena, Matsushita, Mitsubishi, Sharp, Sanyo, Hitachi, NEC, Panasonic, Kodensha, Nova, Oki).

Research during the 1980s typically relied on translation through some variety of intermediary linguistic representation involving morphological, syntactic, and semantic analysis.

At the end of the 1980s, statistical methods emerged as a new approach to machine translation. At IBM Research, a team including Frederick Jelinek, Peter F. Brown, and Robert Mercer began work on statistical machine translation in 1987, using parallel English and French text from the proceedings of the Parliament of Canada. The work led to the 1990 paper A Statistical Approach to Machine Translation, co-authored by Jelinek and his IBM colleagues, and helped establish statistical machine translation as a major research approach.

Makoto Nagao and his group used methods based on large numbers of translation examples, a technique that is now termed example-based machine translation. A defining feature of both of these approaches was the neglect of syntactic and semantic rules and reliance instead on the manipulation of large text corpora.

During the 1990s, encouraged by successes in speech recognition and speech synthesis, research began into speech translation with the development of the German Verbmobil project.

The Forward Area Language Converter (FALCon) system, a machine translation technology designed by the Army Research Laboratory, was fielded 1997 to translate documents for soldiers in Bosnia.

There was significant growth in the use of machine translation as a result of the advent of low-cost and more powerful computers. It was in the early 1990s that machine translation began to make the transition away from large mainframe computers toward personal computers and workstations. Two companies that led the PC market for a time were Globalink and MicroTac, following which a merger of the two companies (in December 1994) was found to be in the corporate interest of both. Intergraph and SYSTRAN also began to offer PC versions around this time. Sites also became available on the internet, such as AltaVista's Babel Fish (using SYSTRAN technology) and Google Translate (also initially using SYSTRAN technology exclusively).

== 2000s ==
The field of machine translation has seen major changes in the 2000s. A large amount of research was done into statistical machine translation and example-based machine translation. In the area of speech translation, research was focused on moving from domain-limited systems to domain-unlimited translation systems. In different research projects in Europe (like TC-STAR) and in the United States (STR-DUST and DARPA Global autonomous language exploitation program), solutions for automatically translating Parliamentary speeches and broadcast news was developed. In these scenarios the domain of the content was no longer limited to any special area, but rather the speeches to be translated cover a variety of topics. The French–German project Quaero investigated the possibility of making use of machine translations for a multi-lingual internet. The project sought to translate not only webpages, but also videos and audio files on the internet.

== 2010s ==
The past decade witnessed neural machine translation (NMT) methods replace statistical machine translation. The term neural machine translation was coined by Bahdanau et al and Sutskever et al who also published the first research regarding this topic in 2014. Neural networks only needed a fraction of the memory needed by statistical models and whole sentences could be modeled in an integrated manner. The first large scale NMT was launched by Baidu in 2015, followed by Google Neural Machine Translation (GNMT) in 2016. This was followed by other translation services like DeepL Translator and the adoption of NMT technology in older translation services like Microsoft translator.

Neural networks use a single end to end neural network architecture known as sequence to sequence (seq2seq) which uses two recurrent neural networks (RNN). An encoder RNN and a decoder RNN. Encoder RNN uses encoding vectors on the source sentence and the decoder RNN generates the target sentence based on the previous encoding vector. Further advancements in the attention layer, transformation and back propagation techniques have made NMTs flexible and adopted in most machine translation, summarization and chatbot technologies.

In July 2024, DeepL announced a next-generation translation engine built on a proprietary large language model tuned for translation and editing; in blind tests commissioned by the company, professional linguists preferred its output over Google Translate 1.3 times more often and over GPT-4 1.7 times more often. Google, which had improved the translation quality of its Gemini models at I/O 2024, integrated Gemini into Google Translate to handle idioms and slang more naturally and introduced live speech-to-speech translation for headphones. Hallucination, bias toward high-resource languages, and the reliability of automatic metrics remain open problems in LLM-based translation.

== See also ==
- History of natural language processing
- ALPAC report
- Computer-assisted translation
- Lighthill report
- Machine translation
