= OpenLogos =

OpenLogos is an open source program that translates from English and German into French, Italian, Spanish and Portuguese. It accepts various document formats and maintains the format of the original document in translation. OpenLogos does not claim to replace human translators; rather, it aims to enhance the human translator's work environment.

The OpenLogos program is based on the Logos Machine Translation System, one of the earliest commercial machine translation programs. The original program was developed by Logos Corporation in the United States, with additional development teams in Germany and Italy.

== History ==
Logos Corporation was founded by Bernard (Bud) Scott in 1970, who worked on its Logos Machine Translation System until the company's dissolution in 2000. The project began as an English-Vietnamese translation system, which became operational in 1972 (during the American-Vietnam War), and later was developed as a multi-target translation solution, with English and German as source languages. Recently, the German Research Center for Artificial Intelligence has been working on OpenLogos, a Linux-compatible version of the original Logos program released under the GNU GPL license.

== Languages ==
Currently, OpenLogos translates from German and English into French, Italian, Spanish and Portuguese. In the long term, the goal of OpenLogos developers is to support bidirectional translation among these languages.

== Historical competitors ==
- SYSTRAN Language Translation Technologies
- SDL International and its free translator
- Intergraph
- Siemens' METAL MT

== See also ==
- Apertium
- Comparison of machine translation applications
- Moses (machine translation)
- Weidner Multi-Lingual Word Processing System

== Bibliography ==
- Anabela Barreiro, Johanna Monti, Brigitte Orliac, Susanne Preuß, Kutz Arrieta, Wang Ling, Fernando Batista, Isabel Trancoso, "Linguistic Evaluation of Support Verb Constructions by OpenLogos and Google Translate", In Proceedings of the Ninth International Conference on Language Resources and Evaluation (LREC'14), European Language Resources Association (ELRA), pages 35–40, Reykjavik, Iceland, May 2014
- Anabela Barreiro, Fernando Batista, Ricardo Ribeiro, Helena Moniz, Isabel Trancoso, "OpenLogos Semantico-Syntactic Knowledge-Rich Bilingual Dictionaries", In Proceedings of the Ninth International Conference on Language Resources and Evaluation (LREC'14), European Language Resources Association (ELRA), pages 3774–3781, May 2014
- Anabela Barreiro, Bernard Scott, Walter Kasper, Bernd Kiefer. "OpenLogos Rule-Based Machine Translation: Philosophy, Model, Resources and Customization". Machine Translation, volume 25 number 2, Pages 107–126, Springer, Heidelberg, 2011. ISSN 0922-6567, doi:10.1007/s10590-011-9091-z
- Bernard Scott, Anabela Barreiro. "OpenLogos MT and the SAL representation language". In Proceedings of the First International Workshop on Free/Open-Source Rule-Based Machine Translation / Edited by Juan Antonio Pérez-Ortiz, Felipe Sánchez-Martínez, Francis M. Tyers. Alicante, Spain: Universidad de Alicante. Departamento de Lenguajes y Sistemas Informáticos. 2–3 November 2009, pp. 19–26
- Bernard Scott: "The Logos Model: An Historical Perspective", in Machine Translation, vol. 18 (2003), pp. 1–72
- Bernard Scott. Linguistic and computational motivations for the LOGOS machine translation system
- OpenLogos introduction by Bernard (Bud) Scott in OpenLogos Mt-list (mailing list)
- Bernard Scott. Translation, Brains and the Computer. A Neurolinguistic Solution to Ambiguity and Complexity in Machine Translation. Machine Translation: Technologies and Applications 2, Springer 2018, ISBN 978-3-319-76628-7, pp. 3–241
