= Optical storage =

Method to store and retrieve computer data using optics

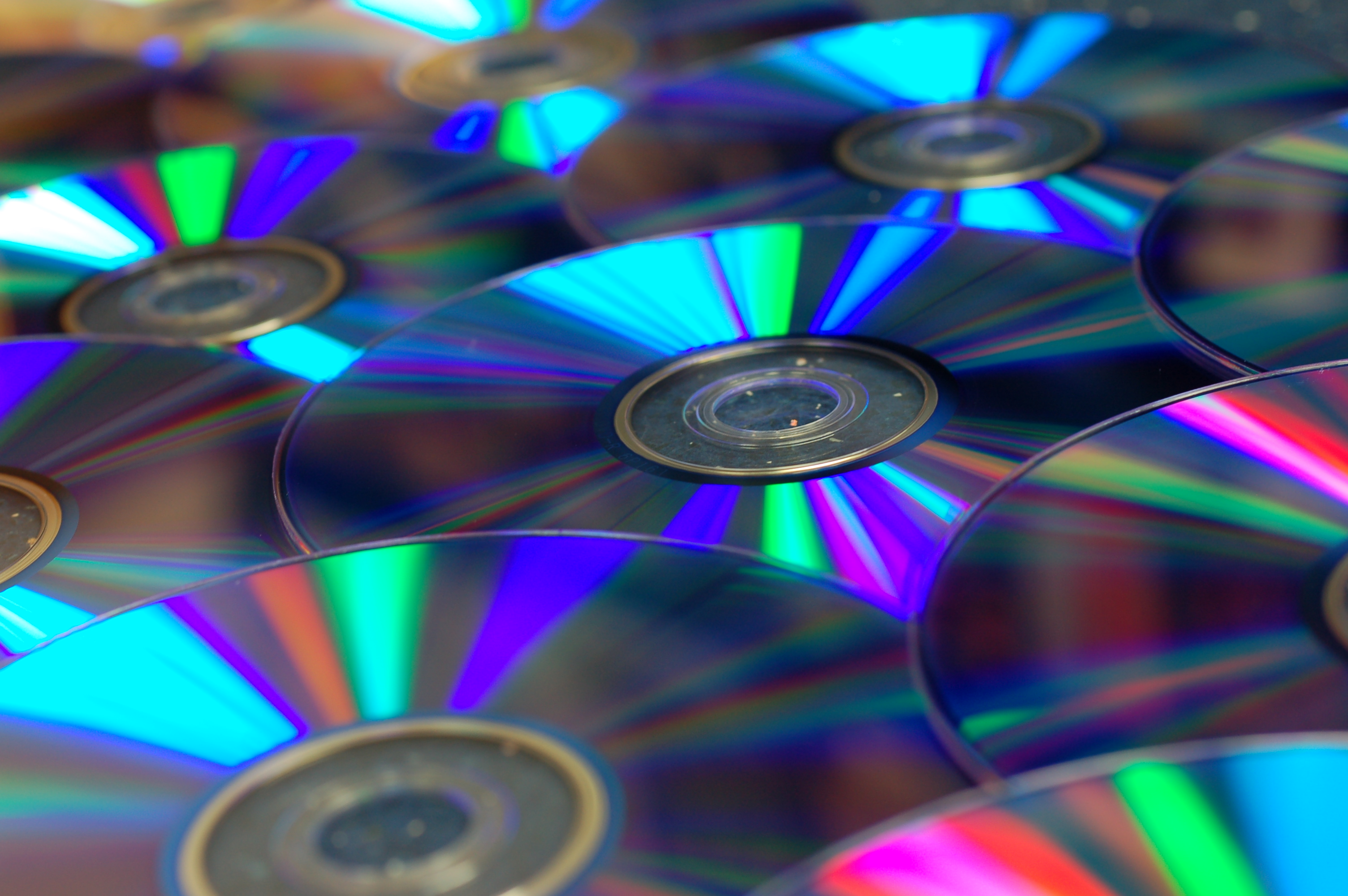
Writable optical data carriers

Optical storage is a class of data storage systems that use light to read or write data to an underlying optical media. Although a number of optical formats have been used over time, the most common examples are optical discs such as the compact disc (CD) and the digital versatile disc (DVD). Reading and writing methods have also varied over time, but most modern systems as of 2023 use lasers as the light source and use it both for reading and writing to the discs. Britannica notes that it "uses low-power laser beams to record and retrieve digital (binary) data."

== Overview ==
Optical storage is the storage of data on an optically readable medium. Data is recorded by making marks in a pattern that can be read back with the aid of light, usually a beam of laser light precisely focused on a spinning optical disc. An older example of optical storage that does not require the use of computers, is microform. There are other means of optically storing data and new methods are in development. An optical disc drive is a device in a computer that can read CD-ROMs or other optical discs, such as DVDs and Blu-ray discs. Optical storage differs from other data storage techniques that make use of other technologies such as magnetism, such as floppy disks and hard disks, or semiconductors, such as flash memory.

Optical storage in the form of discs grants the ability to record onto a compact disc in real time. Compact discs held many advantages over audio tape players, such as higher sound quality and the ability to play back digital sound. Optical storage also gained importance for its green qualities and its efficiency with high energies.

Optical storage can range from a single drive reading a single CD-ROM to multiple drives reading multiple discs such as an optical jukebox. Single CDs (compact discs) can hold around 700 MB (megabytes) and optical jukeboxes can hold much more. Single-layer DVDs can hold 4.7 GB, while dual-layered can hold 8.5 GB. This can be doubled to 9.4 GB and 17 GB by making the DVDs double-sided, with readable surfaces on both sides of the disc. HD DVDs were able to store 15 GB with a single-layer and 30 GB with a dual-layer. Blu-ray discs, which won the HDTV optical format war by defeating HD DVDs, can hold 25 GB for single-layer, 50 GB for dual-layer and up to 128 GB for quad-layer discs. Optical storage includes CDs and DVDs.

== History ==
IBM was a leader in the development of optical storage systems for much of the early history of computing. In 1959, they installed the Automatic Language Translator, which used an optical disk holding 170,000 words and phrases in Russian and their translations in English. In 1961/2, they introduced the IBM 1360, which used small photographic slides that were read using a conventional incandescent lamp as a light source and a photocell as a detector. A separate system wrote data to the slides using an electron gun, making it a read/write system. Fully expanded, the 1360 could hold about a half a terabit of data and allowed for semi-random access. A similar 3rd party system was the Foto-Mem FM 390.

Various forms of optical media, mostly disk form, competed with magnetic recording through most of the 1960s and 70s, but never became widely used. It was the introduction of semiconductor lasers that provided the technology needed to make optical storage more practical in both storage density and cost terms. Prices fell to the point that they could be used in consumer products, leading to the 1978 introduction of the analog LaserDisc format. This was followed in August 1982 by the introduction of the digital audio audio/music CD, which soon led to an effort to standardize data recording on this media. This was introduced in 1985 as the "Yellow Book", which became known as CD-ROM.

In 1983, Philips introduced their early work on magneto-optical drive technology at an industry conference. This used a laser to warm the storage media so that it became susceptible to magnetic fields and an electromagnet, similar to the one in a hard drive, to write data by realigning the material within. It worked like a conventional optical drive during reads, with the laser operating at lower energy levels, too low to heat the disk. Rumors that IBM would use this in future versions of the IBM PC were common for a time, but nothing ever came of this. Canon introduced a version packaged in a jacket similar to those used for the 3.5-inch floppy disk. Introduced in 1985, it found no major uses until 1988 when it was the centrepiece of the NeXT Computer. Variations on this design were introduced through the 1990s but it never became very popular outside of Japan, although Sony's MiniDisc format saw some success.

In 1988, the "Orange Book" added a write-once format, CD-WO, to the existing CD format. The media was compatible with existing CD drives, allowing music and data to be recorded and then read in any existing drive. Over time, this became known as CD-R. In 1990, the Orange Book added magnetic-optical re-writable versions of the CD physical format, CD-MO, which differed from earlier MO systems primarily in that the disk was not enclosed in a jacket. This format saw little use. Continual improvements in drive and media led to the 1997 addition of the CD-RW format, which allowed disks to be written, erased and re-written. This format is incompatible with older CD drives, like CD-R, but read-only drives capable of reading CD-RW became common in the 2000s as CD-RW use proliferated.

Optical media took another large step with the 1996 introduction of DVD, which was to video what the CD was to music. Originally to be known as "digital video disc", the name changed before release to be "digital versatile disc" to indicate that it was also useful for computer storage. Over time, DVDs followed a similar pattern as CDs; Pioneer introduced a write-once format in 1997 that could be read in existing DVD drives, DVD-R. But a second write-once format DVD+R emerged in 2002, leading to a brief format war before dual format drives became common. A read-write format, DVD-RW, was introduced in 1999, but like earlier CDs it could not be read by "normal" DVD drives. Over time, improvements led to most newer DVD drives being able to read any of these media.

Another technical improvement during this era was the introduction of higher-frequency semiconductor lasers operating in the blue and near ultraviolet spectrum. These shorter wavelengths, combined with improvements in the underlying media, allowed much more data to be stored on a disk. With the widespread introduction of high-definition television in the early 2000s, the need for a medium able to store the much larger higher-resolution video files became an issue, leading to two competing standards, HD DVD and Blu-ray. The former could be produced on existing DVD production equipment but (initially) offered lower resolution video formats (and less data storage) while the later required new production equipment but offered 1080p support. Over time, Blu-ray won the resulting high-definition optical disc format war, with Toshiba announcing their withdrawal of HD DVD on February 19, 2008. This proved to be a Pyrrhic victory as the market quickly moved to streaming services. Blu-ray remains preferred to streaming services for its technical qualities, but has a tiny market share as of 2023.

As of 2023, Blu-ray is the last major optical format to reach widespread use. The ever-increasing speed of broadband internet has replaced many of its roles as a distribution medium for media and video games, and the rapidly falling prices of Flash memory through the 2010s did the same in its archival role with read-write formats. A number of new technologies have been proposed as the basis for a new optical standard, but have not seen widespread use. These include:

- the Holographic Versatile Disc (HVD) introduced in 2003, but still not in commercial use
- 210 nanometers ultraviolet lasers which would roughly double density
- 3D optical data storage, which has multiple layers of media and thus stores multiples of Blu-ray capacity
- 5D optical data storage which is primarily aimed at long-term data storage on the order of thousands of years
- Near-field optics
- Solid immersion optics (allowing an extremely high numerical aperture).
- Discs using very short wavelengths such as UV or X-rays.
- Layer selection discs (LS-R).
- Multi-level technology.
- Complex pit shapes allowing multiple channels to be stored on one track.
- Wavelength multiplexing techniques.

The Optical Storage Technology Association (OSTA) was an international trade association formed to promote the use of recordable optical data storage technologies and products.

== In three dimensions ==
3D optical data storage is any form of optical data storage in which information can be recorded or read with three-dimensional resolution (as opposed to the two-dimensional resolution afforded, for example, by CD).

== See also ==
- Optical media preservation
- 5D optical data storage (A method of optical storage using technology similar to that used for Bubblegrams )
