= Statue of Bolesław Wieniawa-Długoszowski =

Monument in Warsaw, Poland

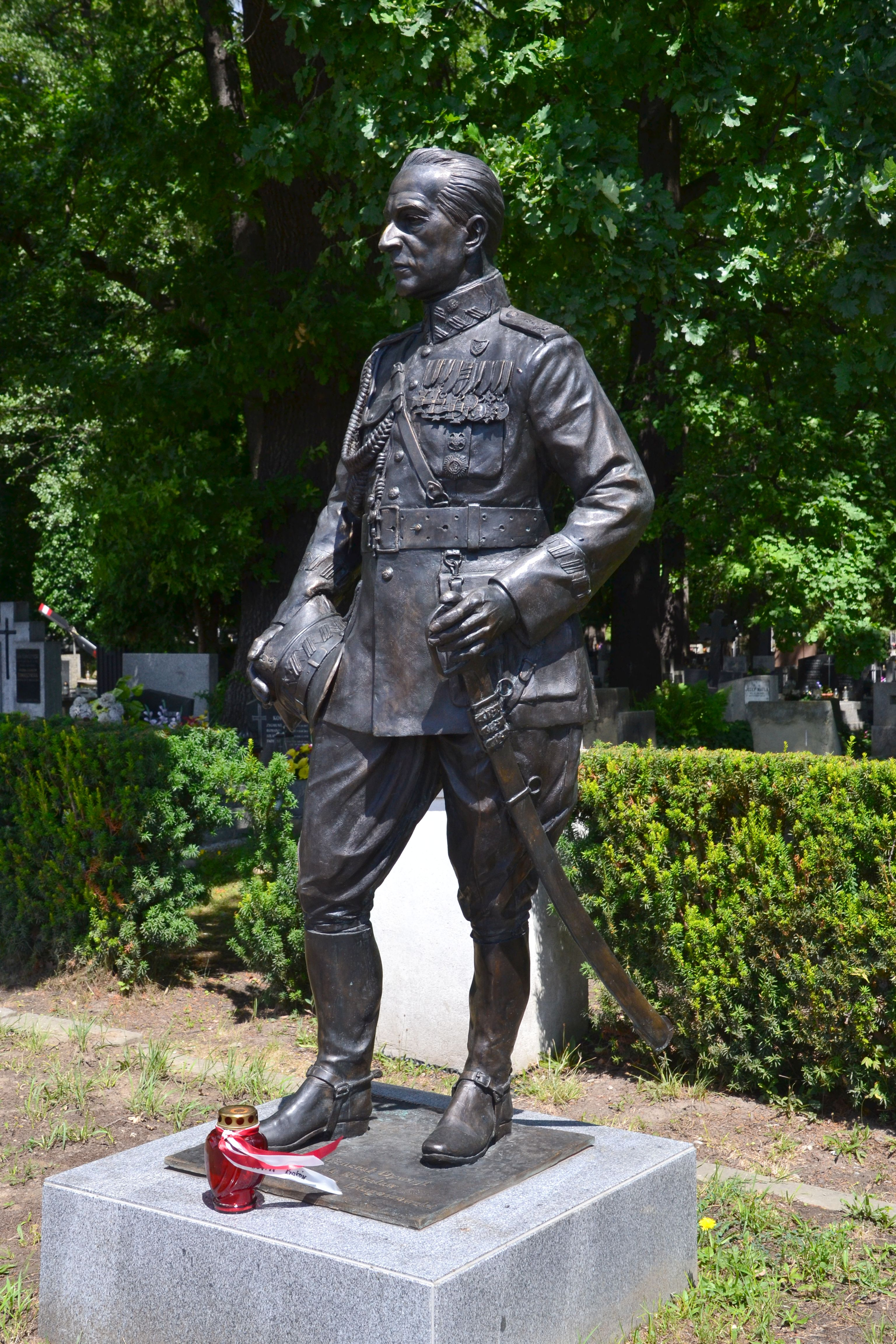
- The monument in 2022.
- Interactive map of Statue of Bolesław Wieniawa-Długoszowski
- Location: Rakowice Cemetery, Old Town, Kraków, Poland
- Coordinates: 50°04′30″N 19°57′7.2″E
- Designer: Michał Pronobis
- Type: Statue
- Material: Bronze
- Opening date: 30 June 2022
- Dedicated to: Bolesław Wieniawa-Długoszowski

The statue of Bolesław Wieniawa-Długoszowski (Polish pronunciation: [bɔˈlɛ.swaf vjɛˈɲa.va dwu.ɡɔˈʂɔf.ski]; Polish: Pomnik Bolesława Wieniawy-Długoszowskiego) is a sculpture in Kraków, Poland, located within the Old Town district. It is dedicated to Bolesław Wieniawa-Długoszowski (1881–1942), a 20th-century military officer and diplomat, who was a division general in the Polish Armed Forces. The monument takes form of his bronze statue, and is placed at the Rakowice Cemetery, near Wieniawa-Długoszowski's grave. The sculpture was designed by Michał Pronobis, and unveiled on 30 June 2022.

== History ==
The monument was dedicated to Bolesław Wieniawa-Długoszowski (1881–1942), a 20th-century military officer and diplomat, who was a division general in the Polish Armed Forces and ambassador of Poland in Italy. The sculpture was designed by Michał Pronobis, and unveiled on 30 June 2022. It was financed by the Institute of National Remembrance, Greater Poland Voivodeship Office, Stanisław Konopka Main Medical Library, and the Centre of Documentation of the Independence Endeavour Foundation.

== Characteristics ==
The sculpture has form of a bronze statue of Bolesław Wieniawa-Długoszowski wearing a military uniform with numerous orders and medals. He holds a rogatywka hat in his right hand, while the left one is put on a hilt of a sabre in a scabbard which is attached to his uniform near the hip. The sculpture is located at the Rakowice Cemetery, near Wieniawa-Długoszowski's grave, within the Old Town district.

== See also ==
- Bolesław Wieniawa-Długoszowski Memorial, another monument dedicated to Wieniawa-Długoszowski, located in Kraków, Poland
