= IBM 1360 =

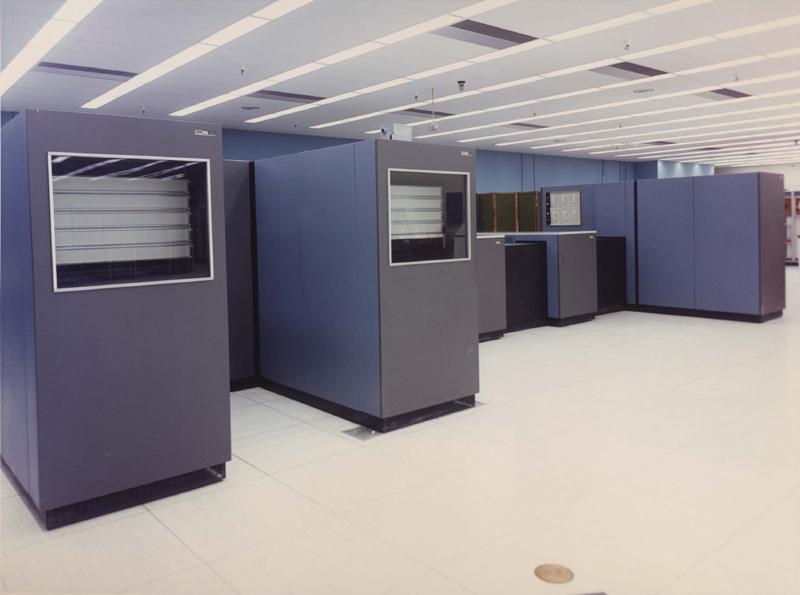
IBM 1360 at the LLNL. On the right is the film development system, on the left two Cell File units with trays visible through the windows.

The IBM 1360 Photo-Digital Storage System, or PDSS, was an online archival storage system for large data centers. It was the first storage device designed from the start to hold a terabit of data (128 GB). The 1360 stored data on index card sized pieces of stiff photographic film that were individually retrieved and read, and could be updated by copying data, with changes, to a new card. Only six PDSSs were constructed, including the prototype, and IBM abandoned the film-card system and moved on to other storage systems soon after. Only one similar commercial system seems to have been developed, the Foto-Mem FM 390, from the late 1960s.

== History ==
=== Walnut ===
In the mid-1950s IBM's San Jose lab was contracted by the CIA to provide a system to retrieve vast numbers of printed documents. The lab was interested in using a new type of photographic film known as Kalvar. Kalvar was developed to make copies of existing microfilm stock, simply by placing the Kalvar and original together, exposing them to ultraviolet light, and then heating the Kalvar to develop it. This could be carried out in a continuous roll-to-roll process. IBM's proposal, code named "Walnut", was a mechanical system that would automate the process of copying materials in the store using the Kalvar film.

To further develop the system, in January 1958, IBM hired Jack Kuehler to head up a team exploring Kalvar-based films. He quickly concluded that Kalvar was not stable enough to store data with the sort of reliability IBM demanded, breaking down over a period of a few years and giving off corrosive gas while it did so. Kalvar is based on a diazo film and Kuehler was able to identify a similar film that would provide the reliability required, although at the price of needing to be developed in a wet lab process. He proposed a new version of Walnut that replaced the Kalvar developer with an automated diazo film developer system that developed the film in a few minutes. He was able to convince the CIA to accept this change, and the new version was announced in 1961 and delivered the next year.

The primary element in a Walnut system was a large cylindrical carousel called the document store. Each store contained 200 small boxes IBM referred to as cells, in keeping with earlier magnetic tape-based systems. Each cell contained 50 strips of film, each of which contained 99 photographs arranged in a 3 by 33 grid. In total, each document store contained images of 990,000 documents, and up to 100 document stores could be used in a single Walnut system, for a total storage of 99,000,000 pages.

A separate system was used to access pages from the Walnut system. Users would look up keywords stored on an IBM 1405 hard disk system, identifying individual documents to be retrieved. The machine produced punched cards that were inserted into the Walnut. The Walnut system retrieved the documents, copied them onto a film strip and developed it, and then inserted four such images into an aperture card. The card could be read directly on a microfilm reader, or used as negatives for full-sized printouts.

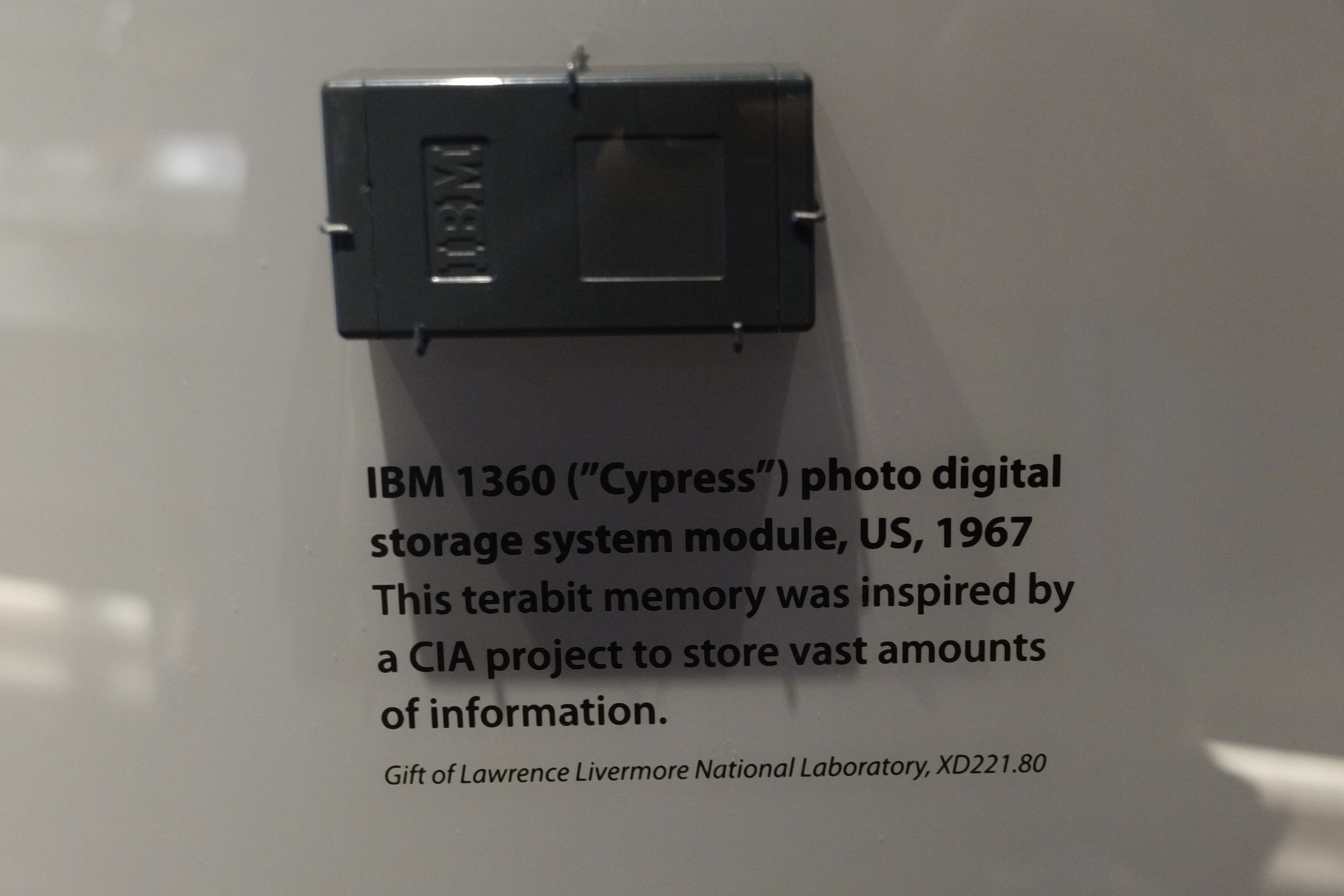
IBM 1360 storage module

=== Cypress ===
When Walnut was successfully delivered in 1961, the San Jose lab turned its attention to commercializing the system under the project name "Cypress". (Note: Cypress was the telephone exchange name of the manager's home.) A direct analog of Walnut for document storage became the 1350 Photo Image Retrieval System, while the same basic system adapted to storing computer data became the 1360 Photo-Digital Storage System. Both systems used the same photographic cards and automated film development system originally developed for Walnut, but replaced the diazo film with longer-lasting conventional silver halide films. The system used pneumatics to move the film cards between the more complex developer system, the reader/copier, and a much larger store. Jack Harker was the Program Manager for the development and delivery of the systems.

At about the same time, the Atomic Energy Commission started looking for a system able to store 1 terabit for online access by supercomputers running simulations. IBM's Thomas J. Watson Research Center proposed a new version of the 10 inch optical disk they had developed for the AN/GSQ-16 (Mark II) Russian-to-English machine translation system. San Jose instead proposed a Cypress system for the same role. Cypress won the contest, and a $2.1 million (equivalent to $22,096,771 in 2024) contract was awarded for two machines, one for the Lawrence Livermore National Laboratory and the other for the Lawrence Berkeley National Laboratory. The former was delivered in September 1967 and the latter in March 1968. Three more systems were eventually delivered, two for the National Security Agency and another for Los Alamos National Laboratory. (Note: The LLNL Photostore was filled thirteen times over before being retired. The software would call for cells to be re-inserted on demand from storage.)

These would be the only Cypress systems delivered. By the time they were in place, IBM had developed a number of other storage systems of similar size, and started suggesting the IBM 3850 in favor of the 1360. Magnetic tape, such as the tape in the 3850, required stricter attention to humidity and temperature than the optical film of the Photostore. Its few users generally preferred the 1360, and three of the five were still being used in 1977, and the last system shut down only in 1980 when IBM stopped servicing them.

The IBM 1350 never sold a single unit. In 1966, the company started a "controlled marketing program", but after a year, they realized that the system would need additional development before it would be commercially acceptable. Instead, they decided to cancel its development.

== Description ==
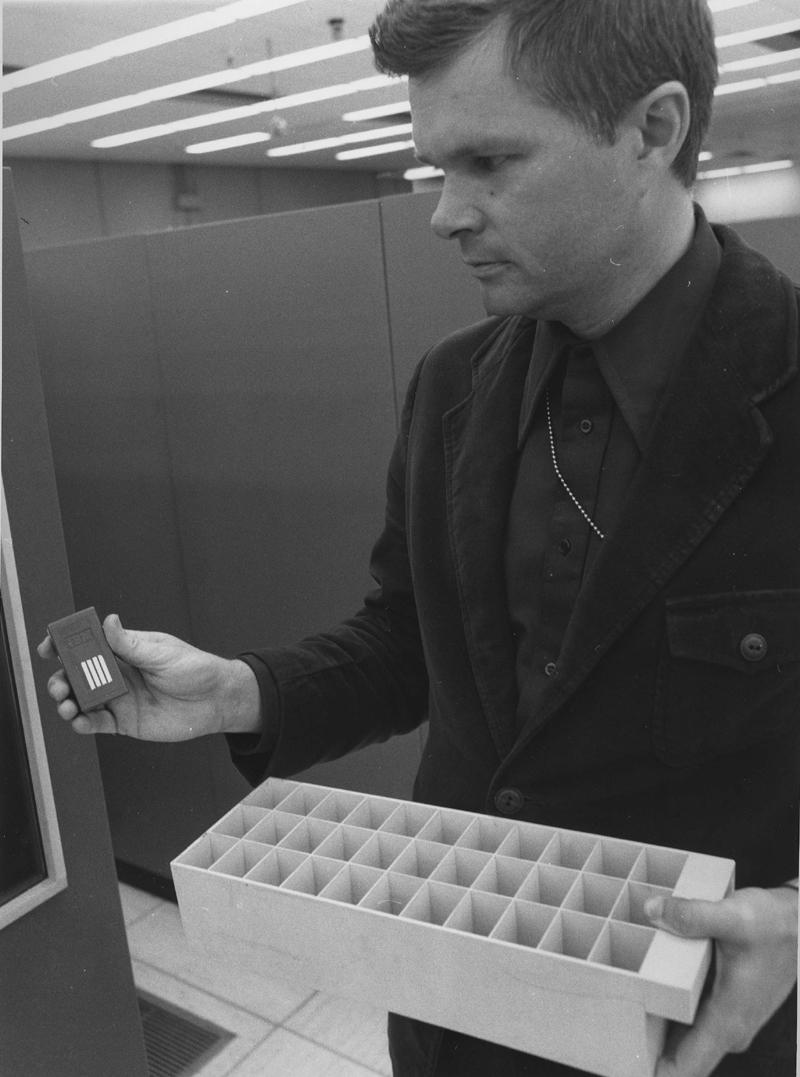
John Fletcher of Lawrence Livermore holds an IBM 1360 Photostore chip box in his right hand, and a loading tray in his left. The chip box holds 32 chips, the tray holds 33 boxes.

Data is written to the chips using an electron gun, similar to the one in CRT-based television. This causes dark spots to appear on the film, as seen in this image.

From the IBM 1360 Photo-Digital Storage System Principles of Operation

Data was stored on small 35 by 70 mm cards of stiff film known as chips, each one holding 32 data "frames" in a 4 x 8 array. Each frame contained 492 lines of about 420 bits each, 0s written as a black-clear pattern, and 1s as a clear-black (using Manchester encoding). In total, each chip held about 6.6 megabits. Chips were delivered in plastic boxes known as cells, each holding 32 chips. For delivery, ten cells were stacked, wrapped in a lightproof plastic wrapper, and then placed in a box. Boxes of cells were loaded into a hopper on the 1365 Photo-Digital Recorder unit, which would cut off the wrapper and drop the cells into a queue. When a cell reached the head of the queue, it was removed and opened, chips being pulled out one at a time as needed.

Data was written to the chips using an electron gun, similar to the operation of a television tube. Sensors and magnets on either side of the chip holder automatically focused the beam and corrected for focus as the filament wore down through use. The gun had eight filaments instead of one, automatically rotating a new one into position as needed to allow it to work for extended periods before replacement. After the chip had been written, it was moved to an automated photo processing system similar to those found at camera shops; the chip was dipped into a series of liquid-filled stations to develop, and then pulled out to dry.

Flaws on the film, impossible to avoid, were addressed to some degree through the use of complex error correction codes, which used up about 30% of the overall storage capacity – thus in each line in a frame only 300 bits were user data, the remainder being used for data redundancy. This resulted in about 4.7 Mbit of usable space in a 6.6 Mbit chip. Error correction could correct for minor imperfections, but not for larger problems or bad developing, so after developing the chips were immediately passed to the 1364 Photo-Digital Reader to ensure they worked. A non-working chip was automatically discarded, and a replacement was made while the data was still in memory.

Data was read off the card by moving it in front of a fixed photocell. Access time was improved by laying out the data in rows that were read in both directions. The head would read off a track of data as the card moved from right to left (say), and then reverse direction and read the other side of the same track from left to right. Once it returned to its original position, it would move onto the next track in the field. The term for this method of data access is boustrophedonic, from a Greek root meaning "as the ox plows." Many computer printers use the same technique to avoid delays moving the print head back across the paper.

Once processed, the chips were re-inserted into the cell from which they had been removed earlier. They were then moved out of the reader and into the 1361 Cell File & Control or additional storage-only 1352 Cell File units. Note the numbering; these units were intended to be shared with the 1350 system. Each file contained 75 trays (5x5 x 3 deep) holding 30 cells each, for a total of 2,250 cells, containing 1/2 a terabit. The system installed at LLNL used one 1361 and one 1352 for a total of one terabit, but other installations typically had two more 1352's for a total of 2 terabits. Cells could be manually moved about by loading them into the front-and-bottom-most set of trays, which could be removed.

Speed of the system was fairly good, writing at about 500 kbit/s, and reading at about 2.5 Mbit/s. Cells were moved between the Files and Readers using a pneumatic tube system similar to those used to move documents around in some stores and hospitals. The system could keep up to 13 cells "in flight" around the system in order to minimize delays.

Controlling the entire system was a small computer, programmed similarly to industrial control computers with a fixed number of tasks running all the time. The controller was also tasked with translating the data to and from the host format. IBM offered the 1367 Data Controller for Control Data systems, realizing that most users with this sort of storage need had a number of CDC machines. Other Controllers were available for different host platforms.
