= Gilbert King =

Gilbert King may refer to:

- Gilbert King, pen name for Susie Frances Harrison (1839–1935), Canadian composer
- Gilbert King (author), American writer and photographer
- Gilbert Walter King, registrar and then judge of the British Supreme Court for China
- Gilbert King, multiple individuals receiving King Baronets in Charlestown, in the United Kingdom
- Gilbert King, chief of engineering at ITC, developer of an Automatic Language Translator system in the 1950s
- Gilbert King, Members of Parliament in 1709–1715, 1737–1747, and 1798 in Jamestown
- Gilbert, King of Hy-Many, 14th century relation of Tadhg Ó Cellaigh

== See also ==
- John Gilbert King, Irish politician
