= Trancoso =

Trancoso may refer to:

- Trancoso Municipality, Zacatecas, a municipality in the state of Zacatecas, Mexico
- Trancoso, Portugal, a municipality in the district of Guarda in the region of Centro, Portugal
  - Castle of Trancoso
- Trancoso, Bahia, a district in the municipality of Porto Seguro in the state of Bahia, Brazil
- Isabel Trancoso, Portuguese researcher in speech processing
