= Jack Harker =

John Mason "Jack" Harker (June 29, 1926 – April 27, 2013) was an inventor, mechanical engineer, and product and program manager who pioneered development of disk storage systems. Starting as a member of the original team that developed the first disk storage system, he went on to develop IBM Direct Access Storage products for the next 35 years. Over that time, Harker was twice director of the IBM San Jose Storage Laboratories, an IBM Fellow, and an IEEE Fellow. He retired from IBM in 1987 and died in 2013.

== Early years ==
Jack Harker was born in San Francisco in 1926 and during World War II enlisted in the navy, becoming an electronics repair specialist, serving on board in both the Atlantic and Pacific. He received his BA in mechanical engineering from Swarthmore in 1950 and master's degree in mechanical engineering from University of California Berkeley in 1952. In 1962 he received a master's degree in electrical engineering from Stanford University.

== IBM career ==
"It isn't often someone gets an opportunity to see an industry get born. Or to participate in its beginning, participate in its formative years, and then still be around to see it become a major worldwide industry."

—Jack Harker, 1987

Harker advanced through a series of positions at IBM to become the IBM San Jose Laboratory Director in 1972. He is best known for his leadership of the 1311 Disk File project, but he considered the 1350/1360 (Cypress) Image Storage System his most challenging assignment and the creation of the Technology and Advanced Development Group (TAD) in 1969 amongst his most important accomplishments.

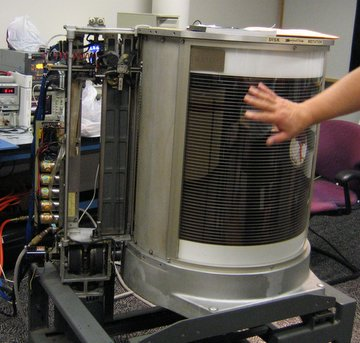
RAMAC mechanism at Computer History Museum

After graduating from Berkeley he was hired in 1952 by Reynold B. Johnson as the eighteenth employee of the new IBM design laboratory in San Jose, California, United States. An early project was as a mechanical engineer on the original team developing the IBM 350 RAMAC disk storage unit, the world's first hard disk drive.

After RAMAC his next project was working for Alan Shugart on the IBM 1301. Harker led development of the first self flying disk heads. As Air Bearing Development Manager, Harker led the development effort for self-acting air bearings, which lowered the disk heads and relied on flying them over the surface using the air flow from the disk underneath instead of the pressurized air from an air compressor as used by RAMAC. Hard disk drives today continue to use self-acting air bearings.

Harker led the IBM 1311 project as the engineering manager for the first successful removable disk drive. He was instrumental in inventing the removable disk pack.

From 1960 to 1969 he was first the engineering manager and then Program Manager for development and delivery of the IBM 1350 Photo Image Retrieval System / 1360 Photo-Digital Storage System. The IBM 1360 was the first "trillion-bit" data storage system (about 160 GB). It was developed for the Atomic Energy Commission.

From 1969 to 1972 he was Direct Access Storage Product Manager responsible for what was then IBM's most profitable line of business. During the time, work was put into place that led to the “Winchester” magnetic recording components and thin film recording structures.

In 1972, Harker first became the director, San Jose Development Laboratory. During this time as Product Manager and then as Laboratory Director, he oversaw development and release of many important and innovative storage systems such as:

- 2305 fixed-head and 3330 disk pack drive systems. In addition to integrating the ferite head and slider unit, they were microcodable systems featuring the first use of an innovative new small disk drive using flexible media to load the microcode; this was the first floppy disk, the IBM 23FD.
- The IBM 3850 Mass Storage System (MSS) (Boulder Labs) automated tape library – an early automated tape library and tape cartridge system
- The IBM 3340 – "Winchester" disk drive
- Thin film disk heads

Harker later held the positions of Director of Technology for IBM and later, again Director of the San Jose Laboratories before his retirement in 1987. He died in 2013.

== Honors ==
- In 1974, Harker was appointed an IBM Fellow.
- In 1993, he received the first IEEE Reynold B. Johnson Information Storage Systems Award "for leadership in the development of information storage devices."
