= TFOT =

TFOT may refer to:

- The Future of Things, a science and technology magazine
- The Fall of Troy (band), a rock trio
