= Bolesław Wieniawa-Długoszowski Memorial =

Monument in Warsaw, Poland

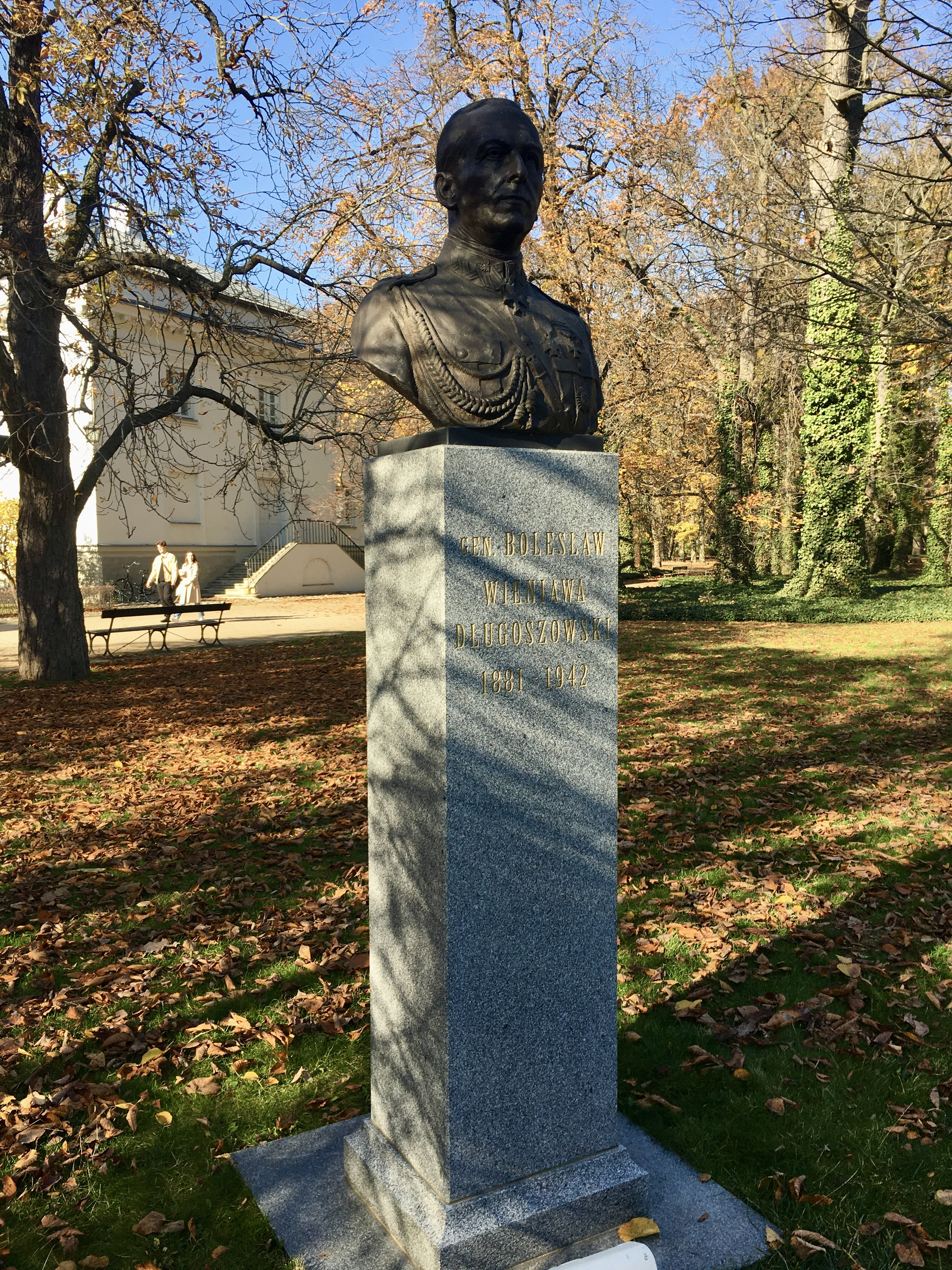
- The monument in 2022.
- Interactive map of Bolesław Wieniawa-Długoszowski Memorial
- Location: Royal Baths Park, Downtown, Warsaw, Poland
- Coordinates: 52°12′57.07″N 21°02′16.72″E
- Designer: Paweł Pietrasiński
- Type: Bust
- Material: Bronze
- Opening date: 8 December 2019
- Dedicated to: Bolesław Wieniawa-Długoszowski

The Bolesław Wieniawa-Długoszowski Memorial (Polish pronunciation: [bɔˈlɛ.swaf vjɛˈɲa.va dwu.ɡɔˈʂɔf.ski]; Polish: Pomnik Bolesława Wieniawy-Długoszowskiego) is a sculpture in Warsaw, Poland, within the neighbourhood of Ujazdów in the Downtown district. It has a form of a bronze bust of Bolesław Wieniawa-Długoszowski (1881–1942), a 20th-century military officer and diplomat, who was a division general in the Polish Armed Forces. The monument is placed in the Royal Baths Park, in front of the building of the Warsaw Officer Candidate School, and near the Myślewice Palace. The sculpture was designed by Paweł Pietrasiński, and unveiled on 8 December 2019.

== History ==
The monument was dedicated to Bolesław Wieniawa-Długoszowski (1881–1942), a 20th-century military officer and diplomat, who was a division general in the Polish Armed Forces, and ambassador of Poland in Italy. The sculpture was designed by Paweł Pietrasiński, and unveiled on 8 December 2019.

== Characteristics ==
The sculpture has form of a bronze bust of Bolesław Wieniawa-Długoszowski wearing a military uniform with numerous orders and medals, placed on top of a granite pedestal. It is located in the Royal Baths Park, in front of the building of the Warsaw Officer Candidate School, and near the Myślewice Palace, which used to be his residence in the 1930s.

== See also ==
- Statue of Bolesław Wieniawa-Długoszowski, another monument dedicated to Wieniawa-Długoszowski, located in Kraków, Poland
