= Susanna Vernon =

Polish conference interpreter (1920-2011)

- Born: Zuzanna Wieniawa-Długoszowska; 11 August 1920; Kraków, Poland
- Died: 16 August 2011 (aged 91); Surbiton, Surrey, England
- Resting place: Vernon family tomb, Lacock, England
- Other name: Susan Wieniawa
- Occupation: Conference interpreter
- Spouse: John Vernon
- Children: Three
- Parent(s): Bolesław Wieniawa-Długoszowski; Bronisława Wieniawa-Długoszowska

Susanna Vernon (11 August 1920 – 16 August 2011) was a pioneer conference interpreter, one of the first to practice simultaneous interpretation, in which the interpreter interprets while the speaker is still speaking.

== Early life and family ==
Zuzanna Wieniawa-Długoszowska was born on 11 August 1920 in Kraków, Poland, to General Bolesław and Bronisława Wieniawa-Długoszowska. Born the day before the Battle of Warsaw, her godfather was Józef Piłsudski. She was an only child. She studied acting at the Royal Academy of Dramatic Art (RADA) in London in 1939–1940. In early 1940 her father, then Polish Ambassador to the Italian government in Rome, summoned her back to Rome. When Italy joined the war on the Axis side in June 1940, she went with her parents into exile in the USA.

== Career ==
After trying a number of jobs during the war, including working as an editorial assistant to Alexander Liberman at Vogue (magazine), she joined the United Nations in late 1946 as one of the first simultaneous interpreters. Simultaneous interpretation was established at the UN by Colonel Léon Dostert, who had pioneered the technique at the Nuremberg trials. She worked initially translating from Spanish and French into English, but her letters show she was soon interpreting in both directions between English and French. During the second part of the first General Assembly of the United Nations, she was spending ten and a half hours at the microphone six days a week, in marked contrast to today's norms.

In 1948 she was transferred to the UN in Geneva, where her languages included Russian. In 1949 she married John Vernon, an Englishman who had a career as an international civil servant with NATO. During the war he worked in section 'D' (General Intelligence) of the Psychological Warfare Branch (PWB) of General Eisenhower's headquarters. His war-time papers are in the Imperial War Museum. Their war-time letters to him have been published. Her first child, Catherine, was born in 1950. In 1952, she left the UN and worked freelance, but returned to full-time work at the OECD (1958–1969), then NATO in Brussels and finally, until she retired in 1982, at the EU in Brussels.

Susanna Vernon was a founding member of the International Association of Conference Interpreters (AIIC) and a friend from childhood of another pioneer simultaneous interpreter and later secretary of AIIC, Marie-France Skuncke. She retired with her husband John to London and died there in 2011. In 2018 her life was one of a dozen featured in an exhibition at the University of Salamanca, “Pioneer Female Interpreters (1900-1953), Bridging the Gap." This exhibition was later shown at the European Commission in Brussels on International Women's Day 2020.
