= ALPAC =

1964 US scientific committee on computational linguistics

ALPAC (Automatic Language Processing Advisory Committee) was a committee of seven scientists led by John R. Pierce, established in 1964 by the United States government in order to evaluate the progress in computational linguistics in general and machine translation in particular. Its report, issued in 1966, gained notoriety for being very skeptical of research done in machine translation so far, and emphasizing the need for basic research in computational linguistics; this eventually caused the U.S. government to reduce its funding of the topic dramatically. This marked the beginning of the first AI winter.

The ALPAC was set up in April 1964 with John R. Pierce as the chairman.

The committee consisted of:

1. John R. Pierce, who at the time worked for Bell Telephone Laboratories
2. John B. Carroll, a psychologist from Harvard University
3. Eric P. Hamp, a linguist from the University of Chicago
4. David G. Hays, a machine translation researcher from RAND Corporation
5. Charles F. Hockett, a linguist from Cornell University
6. Anthony Oettinger, a machine translation researcher from Harvard University
7. Alan Perlis, an Artificial Intelligence researcher from Carnegie Institute of Technology

Testimony was heard from:

- Paul Garvin of Bunker-Ramo Corporation
- Gilbert King of Itek Corporation and previously from IBM
- Winfred P. Lehmann from University of Texas at Austin
- Jules Mersel of Bunker-Ramo Corporation

ALPAC's final recommendations (p. 34) were, therefore, that research should be supported on:

1. practical methods for evaluation of translations;
2. means for speeding up the human translation process;
3. evaluation of quality and cost of various sources of translations;
4. investigation of the utilization of translations, to guard against production of translations that are never read;
5. study of delays in the over-all translation process, and means for eliminating them, both in journals and in individual items;
6. evaluation of the relative speed and cost of various sorts of machine-aided translation;
7. adaptation of existing mechanized editing and production processes in translation;
8. the over-all translation process;
9. production of adequate reference works for the translator, including the adaptation of glossaries that now exist primarily for automatic dictionary look-up in machine translation

== See also ==
- Georgetown–IBM experiment
- AN/GSQ-16 ("Automatic Language Translator", system introduced 1959)
- History of artificial intelligence
- History of machine translation
- AI winter
- Lighthill report
