= The Future of Things =

The Future of Things (TFOT) is an online magazine covering diverse topics related to science and technology. The magazine was launched in 2006.

== History ==
TFOT was founded by Iddo Genuth and co-founder Barak Raz in early 2006 and its beta version was first launched on the 27 of September 2006. During beta the site included two sections – Picture of the Day (PODs) and Articles. In mid-2007 TFOT launched its full version with several new sections and a new design. Its team has more than 20 writers, from various countries worldwide. As of 2013 TFOT has been running under a different management.

== Sections ==
As of September 2008, TFOT had several sections including: headlines, news, PODs, personal columns, book reviews and forums. TFOT also includes full articles which typically contain a Q&A section which, according to TFOT, is a more accurate way of doing an interview. In January 2009 TFOT added a video section featuring science and technology related videos from the web as well as original video clips produced by the TFOT team. Another change in 2009 was the expansion of the daily RSS service, providing headlines from similar websites among the original research published in the website. Until then, a smaller number of headlines were uploaded each day.

== Scoops ==
On August 22, 2007 TFOT was the first to extensively cover the Israeli company Mempile TeraDisc 1TB optical storage technology. The article was later picked up by numerous websites including Engadget, tgdaily and arstechnica. On January 14, 2009 TFOT exclusively reported on advancements in laser hard drive development. This news was quickly picked up by several publications including Engadget and electronista.

== Criticism ==
Since its launch in early 2008, TFOT's headlines section was criticized several times for being too short (approx 500 characters); this, however, is probably the result of copyright issues. A different criticism was raised regarding the relatively short term look at the future of science and technology on TFOT as the site typically deals with research and technology for the next 5–10 years or so.
