= Waidner =

Waidner is a surname. Notable people with the surname include:

- Dennis Waidner (born 2001), German footballer
- Harry Waidner (1874–1944), American tennis player
- Isabel Waidner (born 1974), German-British writer and cultural theorist
- Michael Waidner (born 1961), German computer scientist

== See also ==
- Weidner
