= Bronisława Wieniawa-Długoszowska =

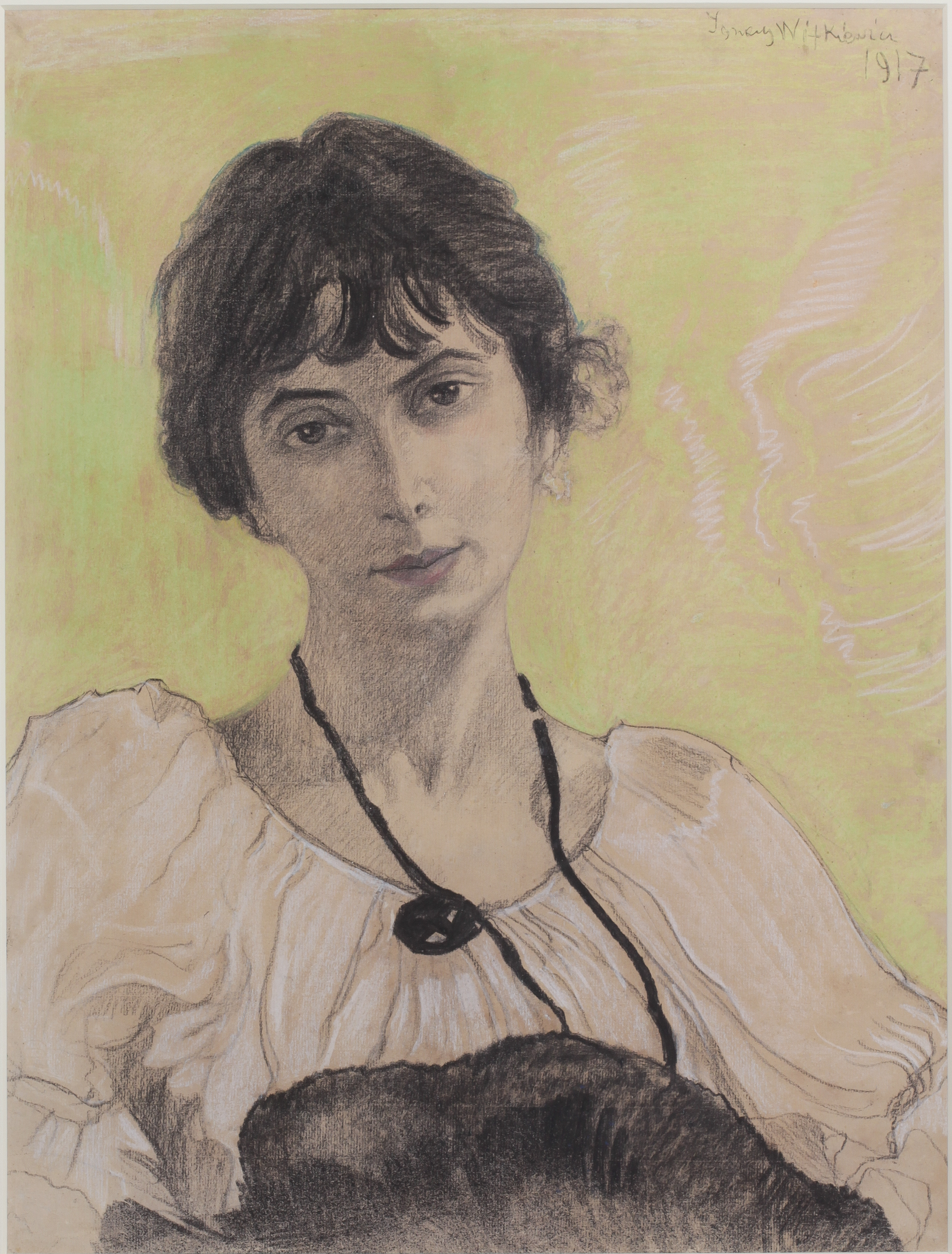
- Portrait of Bronisława Wieniawa-Długoszowska by Stanisław Ignacy Witkiewicz, 1918.
- Born: Bronisława Kliatchkin; 9 June 1886 (Julian calendar: 28 May 1886); Tomaszów Mazowiecki
- Died: 26 August 1953 (aged 66–67); Paris, France
- Resting place: Laurent family tomb, Montparnasse Cemetery, France
- Other name: Jeanne-Liliane Lalande
- Spouses: Leon Berenson; Bolesław Wieniawa-Długoszowski
- Children: Susanna Vernon

Bronisława Wieniawa-Długoszowska (née Kliatchkin; 9 June 1886 – 26 August 1953) was a Polish wartime nurse of Russian Jewish origin.

== Life ==
Her father Salomon (Simeon) Kliatchkin (Russian: Зельман Клячкин; 1858–1916), was the owner of the first credit bureau (credit reference agency) in the Russian Empire. Her mother was Helena Kliatchkin (née Bajenov; 1886–1953). She had nine siblings; one died in childhood, three in Joseph Stalin's purges, one survived in Russia and four survived in exile in France. The family's suffering under Stalin is recorded in a film shown on Russian television in 2008, История семьи как эпоха (The history of a family which was a witness to its epoch).

In 1903, she graduated from a Gymnasium in Łódź. She studied medicine in Paris before 1914. At this time she was married to her first husband, Leon Berenson, a lawyer. Berenson was the defender in the Tsarist courts of Felix Dzerzhinsky, who was to be the founder of the Cheka, the first Soviet secret police agency. At the outbreak of the First World War she volunteered to work as a nurse at the Hotel Continental in Paris, now the Westin Paris - Vendôme. She nursed Pierre Laurent (1892–1935), a young French officer, the son of Charles Laurent, a French senior civil servant.

Pierre was sent to join the military mission of General Lavergne in Saint Petersburg, then called Petrograd. Lavergne had succeeded General Henri Niessel as head of the French military mission. There Pierre was responsible for obtaining information about the Russian army. Bronisława, back in Petrograd, helped him. After Lenin arrived in his sealed train their priority was to prevent him leading Russia into an armistice with Germany. They were able to obtain telegrams to Lenin appearing to show that he was supported by German funds. They presented this information to the Provisional government headed by Prince Georgy Lvov on 24 June, but no action was taken at that meeting. However, Justice Minister Pereverzev investigated further and was able to obtain a fuller set of 66 telegrams (Lyandres). These proved the existence of an import business from Sweden run by the Bolsheviks, but it was the evidence of contact with known German agents which was damming. The July Days (3–7 July) were the Bolshevik's second attempt at a coup. On 4 July, Pereverzev shared the information gained from the telegrams with General Peter Polovtsov, commander of the Petrograd garrison, some newspaper editors and other ministers. According to Sean McMeekin, revulsion among the soldiers at the knowledge that Lenin was in contact with the enemy brought them on the side of the provisional government and ended the coup attempt. The next day Pereverzev's men raided the Kschessinskaya mansion where the Bolsheviks were based. Many Bolsheviks were arrested and Lenin fled to Finland. According to McMeekin, recently opened Russian archives contain evidence, from the investigation triggered by the telegrams, that the import business was a front for laundering money being sent by the German government to the Bolsheviks. We can suppose, then, that Pierre and Bronia's activities, helped to postpone the Bolshevik revolution from July to the "October Revolution" some four months later.

A year after the October Revolution, in October 1918, Bronisława escaped on a false French passport under the name of "Jeanne-Liliane Lalande". While in Petrograd, she had met Bolesław Wieniawa-Długoszowski, a Polish officer. At considerable personal risk to herself she was able to persuade the Cheka to release him from Taganka Prison in Moscow to house arrest at her house. They both escaped to Poland, and he became her second husband. They were married in a Protestant ceremony on 2 October 1919. On the marriage register she used the details, including the name 'Lalande' from the false French passport. They had one daughter, Zuzanna, later Susanna Vernon (11 August 1920 – 3 August 2011), goddaughter of Józef Piłsudski, the main leader of Poland between the wars, who was a friend of her father. During summers, the family lived in the manor house of Bobowa. They famously had good, if distant, relations with the Hasidic Jews of Bobowa (Bobov) and the Bobov Rebbe Ben Zion Halberstam. The rest of the year they lived in their official residence; a hunting lodge in Łazienki Park in the center of Warsaw.

When, in 1938, General Bolesław Wieniawa-Długoszowski was sent to Rome as Polish ambassador to the government of Benito Mussolini, Bronisława accompanied him. When Italy joined the war with the other Axis powers in 1940 they fled together to New York. In 1942 he committed suicide. She and her daughter were looked after for some weeks by Arthur Szyk, the famous cartoonist and anti-Nazi activist. Tatiana Yacovleff du Plessix Liberman was another friend who, with her husband, Alexander Liberman, helped Zuzanna find work at Vogue magazine and, later, at the United Nations, where she became one of the first simultaneous interpreters.

Bronisława returned to Europe after the war and died in Paris in August 1953 of the complications of a gall bladder operation. She is buried in the Montparnasse Cemetery, giving as her maiden name her assumed name "Jeanne-Liliane Lalande", in the Laurent family tomb. As explained in the Russian film mentioned above, after half a century without contact, twenty years after Bronisława's death, the Russian and French descendants of Salomon Kliatchkin were re-united.

A recent book published by the Polish Institute of National Remembrance (Instytut Pamięci Narodowej) has confirmed Bronisława's Jewish roots and uncovered many archival sources about her early life which had been thought to be destroyed

== Bibliography ==
- Parowicz, Izabella; Kolmasiak, Mariusz (2026). Generał Bolesław Wieniawa-Długoszowski 1881–1942. Warsaw: Instytut Pamięci Narodowej. ISBN 978-83-8376-970-7.
- Belonging and Betrayal, The life of Bronisława Wieniawa Długoszowska, Gervase Vernon, Amazon 2013
- The Bolshevik's German Gold revisited, Semion Lyandres, The Carl Beck Papers number 1106 1995
- The Russian Revolution, a new history, Sean McMeekin, Profile books 2017
- Szuflada Generała Wieniawa, edited by Elżbieta Grabska and Marek Pitasz, Państwowy Instytut Wydawniczy, Warsaw 1998. p. 119
- Wieniawa poeta, żolnierz, dyplomata, Dworzynski W. Wyd. 1 ed. Warszawa: Wydawnictwa Szkolne i Pedagogiczne; 1993.p. 364
- Szabla i koń, Wittlin T. Londyn: Polska Fundacja Kulturalna; 1996. p. 321
- Wieniawa. Szwoleżer na Pegazie, Marian Urbanek, Wroclaw: Wydaw. Dolnośląskie; 1991. p. 261
- Księga gości Jana Lechonia, Jan Lechon, ALGO 1999 ISBN 8388033255
- Pierre Laurent, François Garnier, Paris, July 1998
- Vanished Kingdoms, Norman Davies, Allen Lane, London 2011 (p. 473 for the relation between the Bobov Rebbe and Wieniawa)
