= Foto-Mem =

Foto-Mem Inc. was a US company that attempted to introduce very large computer memory systems based on optical storage on microfiche cards. An alternate product line based on the same mechanical systems allowed a single microfiche card to be displayed on multiple workstations, intended for large libraries where a single card might be used by several people at once. Only one such system was ever delivered, a microfiche reader for The New York Times; this system was never successful and the company failed as a result.

== FM 390 ==
The company was formed on May 5, 1967 by James Laura, who considered himself primarily a financial consultant, but had some experience in computers. His idea was to use existing microfiche systems to develop a computer memory system with a "multi-billion bit capacity", a concept IBM had recently introduced in a more complex and less-standard fashion as the IBM 1360 Photostore. The 1360 used custom film "chips" packed into custom boxes used with custom hardware to move and file them. In comparison, the Foto-Mem concept would use standard microfiche ISO A5 (105 x 148 mm) cards, using a laser to read and write the cards instead of the Photostore's complex electron-beam writer. Additionally the mechanical systems were developed for other purposes by a 3rd party, Mosler, who sold a sorting system known as the Selectriever. By combining the two technologies, Laura could develop a highly competitive device for costs well below the Photostore.

In January 1968 he hired Albert Eng to run development of the system Laura had sketched out, now known as the FM 390. The 390 consisted of two main parts, the reader/writer on top, and the store and retrieval system under it. Together they formed a single two-part cabinet about the size of a large drum printer. The "Foto-Data Cards" used to store data were standard A5 microfiche, but punched along one edge to allow them to be mechanically sorted. The Cards were packed into "Foto-Data Cell"s, each containing 100 cards (IBM used similar terminology). Each 390 stored up to 250 Cells, for a combined total of "1 to 3 billions bits of information".

== Risar ==
During development of the FM 390 they decided to use the Selectriever system to develop a second product, the Risar, which placed the microfiche cards in front of a TV camera, sending the display to televisions at remote locations. This allowed a Risar customer to place workstations around their buildings, with their employees accessing the data without having to remove the card from the store. Additionally the same signal could be sent to more than one workstation, eliminating contention problems on commonly accessed cards. Card selection, indexing and retrieval was controlled by an associated computer.

Prototypes both machines were completed and demonstrated publicly at various trade shows. However the company was rapidly running out of money, and in September 1969 they started the process of raising a debenture offering to fund continued development. Shortly after these were sold in January 1970, the company made their first sale, a Risar for The New York Times. In this particular case the Risar was controlled by an IBM System/360 computer with a 24 k (words or bytes is not clear) index database, with abstracts being held on an associated disk system. However Mosler was also in the running for the contract, and when Foto-Mem won they immediately refused to sell the Selectriever internals to them. Foto-Mem was forced to develop their own system, and delivered it in August 1970. However this system never operated well, and even with months of on-site work by the Foto-Mem engineers, the system never lived up to its promises.

== Failure ==
Even while the Risar was being developed, additional funding was needed and Laura called a meeting of the existing stakeholders in order to raise more capital. None was immediately forthcoming when the meeting opened on July 15, and when hard questions about the financial state of the company were asked, Laura left abruptly. The company was eventually forced to file for Chapter 11 bankruptcy proceedings on January 30, 1971. A lawsuit followed, with some of the shareholders claiming Laura and Eng had falsely described the "working prototypes" as "working".
