= METAL MT =

A machine translation system developed at the University of Texas and at Siemens which ran on Lisp Machines.

== Background ==
Originally titled the Linguistics Research System (LRS), it was later renamed METAL (Mechanical Translation and Analysis of Languages). It started life as a German-English system funded by the USAF.

== 1980 ==
A copy of the Weidner Multi-Lingual Word Processing software was requested by the German Government for the Siemens Corporation of Germany in September 1980 and was nicknamed the Siemens-Weidner Engine (originally English-German). This revolutionary multilingual word processing engine became foundational in the development of the Metal MT project, according to John White of the Siemens Corporation.

After the Metal MT, development Rights to the Siemens-Weidner Engine were sold to a Belgium company, Lernout & Hauspie.

The Siemens copy of the Weidner Multilingual Word Processing software has since been acquired through the purchase of assets of Lernout & Hauspie by Bowne Global Solutions, Inc., which was later acquired by Lionbridge Technologies, Inc. and is demonstrated in their itranslator software.
