= Weidner =

Weidner is a German surname of several suggester origins. Notable people with the surname include:

- Brant Weidner (born 1960), American basketball player
- Gabrielle Weidner (1914–1945), Dutch World War II heroine
- Johan Hendrik Weidner (1912–1994), Dutch World War II resistance fighter
- Sadie Lea Weidner (1875–1939), American missionary to Japan
- Stephan Weidner (born 1963), head of the German hard-rock band Böhse Onkelz

== See also ==
- Waidner
