= Weidner Multi-Lingual Word Processing System =

The Weidner Multi-Lingual Word Processing System was a computer-assisted translation technology released in the United States in 1977 by Weidner Communications Corporation (WCC), a now defunct US company. The system represented a significant breakthrough in machine translation and multilingual word processing, improving translation efficiency and output for commercial applications.

== History ==
=== Market introduction and impact ===
After its introduction to the market in 1977, the Weidner Multi-Lingual Word Processing System was reported in 1978 in the Wall Street Journal as "Quadrupling Translation Volume" and the Deseret News as "halving translation costs and of increasing output by at least 400 percent".

This new technology was demonstrated to translation experts on September 12, 1978, at Brigham Young University in Provo, Utah. Thomas Bauman and Leland Wright of the American Translators Association arrived at the university on September 11, 1978, to evaluate the system's capabilities. After attending the demonstration, Bauman said he had "never been so converted to anything so fast in my life." He subsequently extended an invitation for Wydner to attend the annual meeting of the American Translators Association the following October.

Translation experts at the European Commission said that Wydner's new translation system "renewed [their] hope" for machine translation.

During the mid-1980s, WCC was the largest translation company by sales volume in the United States.

While translations were rough, they represented a significant improvement in performance over fully manual work. Once text was input into the translation system, the software generated a list of untranslatable terms from the source material. Human translators were then required to provide translations for these terms, including detailed linguistic information such as noun gender, plural formation, and alternative word meanings. While this process was initially time-consuming, the expanding computer dictionary reduced the manual effort needed for subsequent translations.

=== Corporate challenges and restructuring ===
The company faced significant challenges in the early 1980s. In 1982, Stephen Weidner encountered financial difficulties related to a Research and Development Tax Shelter he had established. Legal disputes over Weidner's assets eventually required court intervention, leading to a court-ordered liquidation.

In 1984, as part of the court ordered settlement, the company was purchased by Bravis International, one of Japan's largest translation companies. WCC continued to operate, maintaining offices in Chicago and Paris.

=== Internal conflicts and technology rights ===
The development and control of the Weidner technology became complicated by internal conflicts between the Weidner brothers. Bruce Wydner was the principal agent for the company Inns of the Temple Inc., which retained the research and development rights to the Weidner Multi-lingual Word Processor, and separated himself from his brother Stephen in early 1979. Following this separation, Bruce ceased providing updated software developments. Weidner had offended his brother by having Eyring Research Institute send their bilingual employee to remove Wydners intellectual property from his home, which Wydner claims was stolen from him.

== Technology legacy and acquisitions ==
=== Lionbridge and iTranslator ===
In September 1980, the German government requested a copy of the Weidner Multi-Lingual Word Processing software on behalf of Siemens. This version became known as the Siemens-Weidner Engine, initially designed for English-German translation. According to John White of Siemens, this revolutionary multilingual word processing engine became foundational in the development of the Metal MT project.

The Siemens copy of the Weidner Multi-lingual Word Processing software was eventually acquired by Bowne Global Solutions Inc., through the purchase of assets from Lernout & Hauspie. Bowne Global Solutions was subsequently acquired by Lionbridge Technologies Inc., where the technology was integrated into their iTranslator software.

=== WordPerfect ===
The Eyring Research Institute served as a development environment for Bruce Bastian, a co-founder of WordPerfect and one of the original programmers assisting Bruce Wydner in creating the original Weidner Spanish-English Multi-lingual Word Processor.

This multilingual system became the foundation for the WordPerfect monolingual word processor, which was initially produced for English and subsequently adapted for Spanish.

Ronald G. Hansen, the President of the Eyring Research Institute, reportedly asked Bruce Wydner the following in 1978: "Bruce Bastian says that this Multilingual Wordprocessor of yours has a lot more uses than just translating languages. He says that it could be used to produce monolingual word processors and wants to know if you will let him do that".

== Sources ==
- Natural Language Computing: The commercial applications, Tim Johnson, Published by Ovum Ltd, London, 1985 ISBN 0-903969-22-X
- Slocum, Jonathan (1984). "Machine Translation: its History, Current Status, and Future Prospects" (PDF). Siemens Communications Systems, Inc., Linguistics Research Center, University of Texas, Austin, Texas.
- The Fastest Way to Learn Spanish is to See IT!, by Spanish New Learning Center, Hawkes Publishing Inc., 1975, ISBN 0-89036-083-9
- Twenty years of Translating and the Computer, John Hutchins, 1998 http://www.hutchinsweb.me.uk/Aslib-1998.pdf
- Practical Experience of Machine Translation, Veronica Lawson, North Holland Publishing Company, Amsterdam, the Netherlands 1982
- Machine Translation Today; The State of the Art, Margaret King, Edinburgh University Press, Edinburgh, Scotland 1984
- Machine Translation; Past, Present, Future, W. J. Hutchins, Ellis Norwood Limited, Chichester, England, 1986
- Machine Translation, Ian Pigott, Commission of the European Communities, Luxemburg, XIII-84 IP, November 1991.
- Language Software and Technology, Report by Michael Quinlan, President of Transparent Language to LDS Church, New Hampshire, www.transparent.com, March 8, 2000
- Analyse des Systems zur computergestützten Übersetzung Weidner – Version Französisch-Englisch 2.5, http://www.dialog-translations.com/bilder/Diplomarbeit%20Hans%20Christian%20von%20Steuber.pdf Archived 2008-10-31 at the Wayback Machine
- Michael G. Hundt: Working with the Weidner machine-aided translation system, in: Veronica Lawson (Hg): Translating and the computer 4 - Practical experience with machine translation, London, 1982
- Trial of the Weidner computer-assisted translation system, Translation Bureau Canada, Project No. 5-5462, 1985
- WCC's translation bureau, Henrietta Pons, Veronica Lawson 1982
- Ulla Magnusson-Murray: Operational experience of a machine translation service, in Veronica Lawson (Hg): Translating and the computer 5 - Tools for the trade, London 1983, S.171-180; Tim Johnson ebd:283-286
