= Georgetown–IBM experiment =

1954 demonstration of machine translation

The Georgetown–IBM experiment was an influential demonstration of machine translation, which was performed on January 7, 1954. Developed jointly by Georgetown University and IBM, the experiment involved completely automatic translation of more than sixty Russian sentences into English.

== Background ==
Conceived and performed primarily in order to attract governmental and public interest and funding by showing the possibilities of machine translation, it was by no means a fully featured system: It had only six grammar rules and 250 lexical items in its vocabulary (of stems and endings). Words in the vocabulary were in the fields of politics, law, mathematics, chemistry, metallurgy, communications and military affairs. Vocabulary was punched onto punch cards. This complete dictionary was never fully shown (only the extended one from Garvin's article). Apart from general topics, the system was specialized in the domain of organic chemistry. The translation was carried out using an IBM 701 mainframe computer (launched in April 1953).

The Georgetown-IBM experiment is the best-known result of the MIT conference in June 1952 to which all active researchers in the machine translation field were invited. At the conference, Duncan Harkin from US Department of Defense suggested that his department would finance a new machine translation project. Jerome Weisner supported the idea and offered finance from the Research Laboratory of Electronics at MIT. Leon Dostert had been invited to the project for his previous experience with the automatic correction of translations (back then 'mechanical translation'); his interpretation system had a strong impact on the Nuremberg War Crimes Tribunal. The linguistics part of the demonstration was carried out for the most part by linguist Paul Garvin who had also good knowledge of Russian.

Over 60 Romanized Russian statements from a wide range of political, legal, mathematical, and scientific topics were entered into the machine by a computer operator who knew no Russian, and the resulting English translations appeared on a printer.

The sentences to be translated were carefully selected. Many operations for the demonstration were fitted to specific words and sentences. In addition, there was no relational or sentence analysis which could recognize the sentence structure. The approach was mostly 'lexicographical' based on a dictionary where a specific word had a connection with specific rules and steps.

== Algorithm ==
The algorithm first translates Russian words into numerical codes, then performs the following case-analysis on each numerical code to choose between possible English word translations, reorder the English words, or omit some English words.

The flowchart of the algorithm is reproduced in (see Table 1 for the 6 rules).

== Translation examples ==
How it analyzes Vyelyichyina ugla opryedyelyayetsya otnoshyenyiyem dlyini dugi k radyiusu (figure 2 of).

Russian word	English equivalents	code	rule number
vyelyichyina	magnitude	/-/-/	6
ugl-	coal, angle	121-/-25	2
-a	of	131-222-25	3
opryedyelyayetsya	is determined	/-/-/	6
otnoshyenyi-	relation, the relation	151-/-/	5
-yem	by	131-/-/	3
dlyin-	length	/-/-/	6
-i	of	131-/-25	3
dug-	arc	/-/-/	6
-i	of	131-/-25	3
k	to, for	121-/-23	2
radyius-	radius	/-221-/	6
-u	to	131-/-/	3

Russian (Romanized)	English translation
Mi pyeryedayem mislyi posryedstvom ryechyi.	We transmit thoughts by means of speech.
Vyelyichyina ugla opryedyelyayetsya otnoshyenyiyem dlyini dugi k radyiusu.	Magnitude of angle is determined by the relation of length of arc to radius.
Myezhdunarodnoye ponyimanyiye yavlyayetsya vazhnim faktorom v ryeshyenyiyi polyityichyeskix voprosov.	International understanding constitutes an important factor in decision of political questions.

== Reception ==
Well publicized by journalists and perceived as a success, the experiment did encourage governments to invest in computational linguistics. The authors claimed that within three or five years, machine translation could well be a solved problem. However, the real progress was much slower, and after the ALPAC report in 1966, which found that the ten years of long research had failed to fulfill the expectations, funding was reduced dramatically.

The demonstration was given widespread coverage in the foreign press, but only a small fraction of journalists drew attention to previous machine translation attempts.
