= Bolesław Wieniawa-Długoszowski =

Polish general and President of Poland for one day

Generał Bolesław Wieniawa-Długoszowski
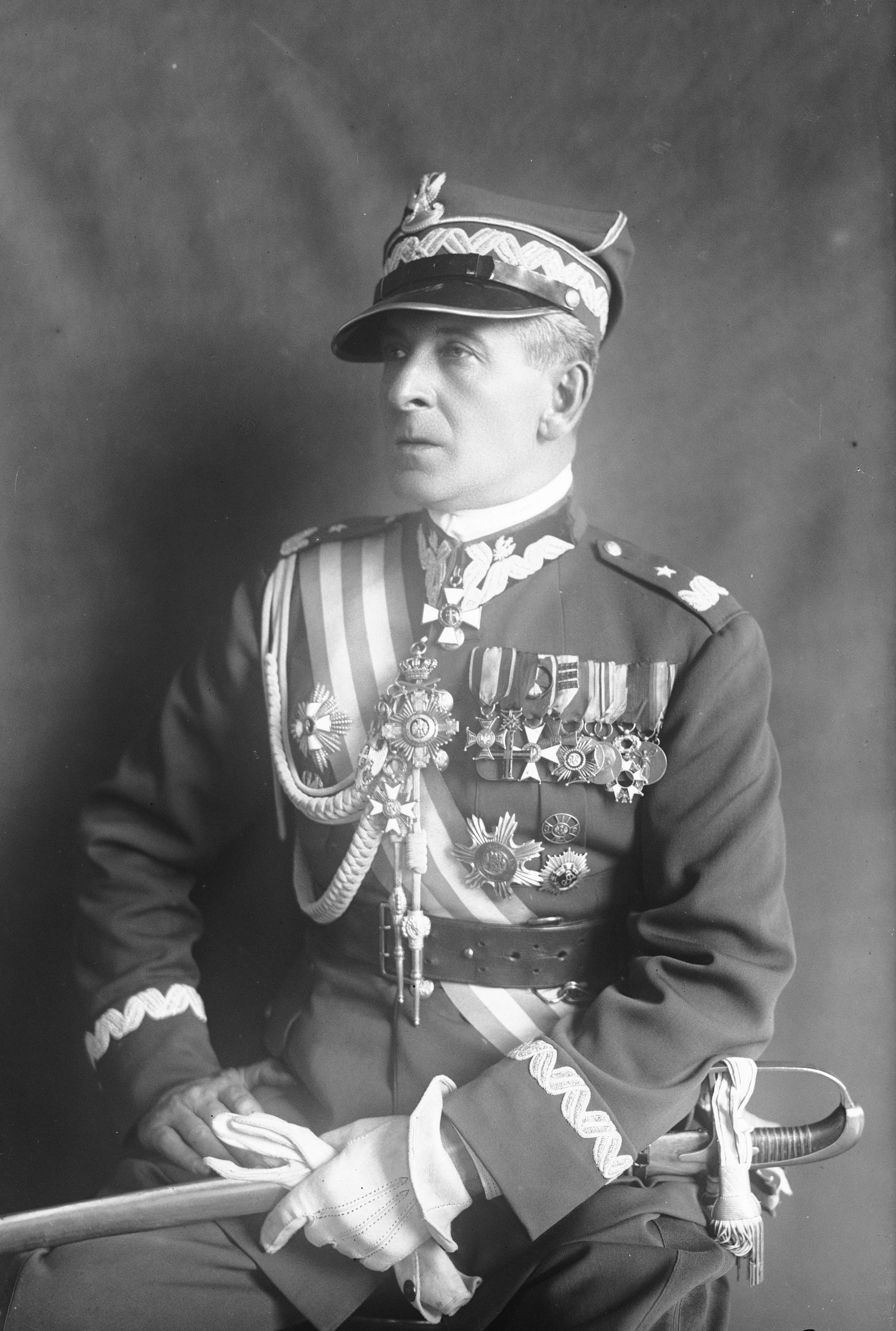
- Photograph by Narcyz Witczak-Witaczyński

Acting President of Poland
- In office 25 September 1939 – 26 September 1939

Personal details
- Born: 26 July 1881 Maksymówka, Kingdom of Galicia and Lodomeria, Austria-Hungary
- Died: 1 July 1942 (aged 61) New York City, New York, United States of America
- Spouse(s): Stephania Calvas, Bronisława Wieniawa-Długoszowska
- Children: Susanna Vernon
- Education: Higher War School

Bolesław Ignacy Florentyn Wieniawa-Długoszowski (26 July 1881 – 1 July 1942) ; Polish: [bɔˈlɛ.swaf vjɛˈɲa.va dwu.ɡɔˈʂɔf.ski]) was a Polish general, adjutant to Chief of State Józef Piłsudski, politician, freemason, diplomat, poet, artist and formally for one day the President of the Republic of Poland.

He was one of the generation that fought for and saw the rebirth of an independent Poland on 11 November 1918 (National Independence Day), only to see that independence lost again after the 1939 division of Poland between Nazi Germany and the Soviet Union pursuant to the Molotov–Ribbentrop Pact.

== Before World War I ==
Bolesław Wieniawa-Długoszowski was born 26 July 1881 on his family's estate in Maksymówka near Stanisławów in Galicia, then part of the Austro-Hungarian Empire, (now Ivano-Frankivsk in Ukraine), the son of Bolesław Długoszowski (a railway engineer, who built the railway from Tarnów to Krynica-Zdrój via Bobowa) and Józefina, née Struszkiewicz. He had an elder brother Kazimierz and two sisters: Teofila (Michalewska) the grandmother of Inka Bokiewicz, the girl who first adopted Wojtek the bear and Zofia (Kubicka).

In 1877, his family bought the manor house in Bobowa. Bobowa, (Bobov in Yiddish), was a centre of Hassidic life in Poland. There were good relations between the Jews of Bobowa and the Długoszowski family (Kazimierz, the elder brother, appears with Grand Rabbi Ben Zion Halberstam on the cover of the book "Jewish Society in Poland"). There, Bolesław spent his early life. He attended secondary school in Lwów, then he moved to a school in Nowy Sącz, graduating in 1900. Subsequently, he studied medicine at Jan Kazimierz University (currently Lviv University) in Lwów, graduating with high distinction in 1906. In 1906 he married his first wife, the singer Stephania Calvas.

After his studies, he moved to Berlin, where he spent a year studying at the Berlin Academy of Fine Arts. After completing his degree there in 1907, he moved to Paris, where he worked as a private physician.

Between 1907 and 1914, he lived in Montparnasse sharing to the full in the bohemian life of Paris, mixing with the Polish artists living there, many of whom were members of the Young Poland movement. In 1911, he was a founder, with the sculptor Stanisław Kazimierz Ostrowski of the Association of Polish Artists (Towarzystwo Artystów Polskich). In 1912, he formed the "cercle parisien des sciences militaires" with Waclaw Sieroszewski, Andrzej Strug and others. The next year, this group joined the main Riflemen's Association (Związek Strzelecki "Strzelec"), where he met Józef Piłsudski in December 1913.

== 1914–1942 ==
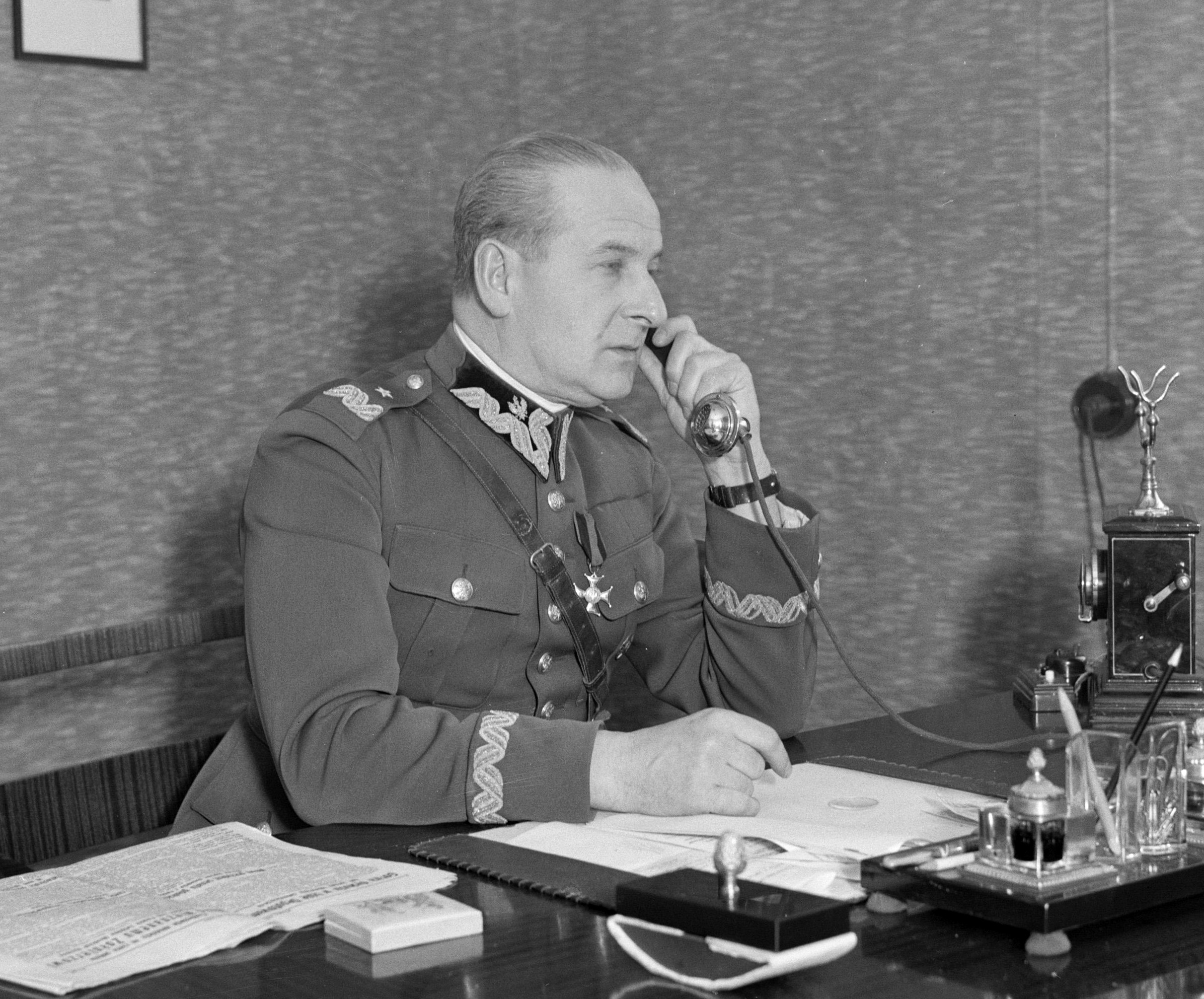
Wieniawa-Długoszowski, 1934

In 1914, he moved to Kraków and joined the First Cadre Company, which fought on the Austro-Hungarian side against Russia. In October 1914, he became a commander of a platoon of a squadron in 1st Uhlans Regiment of Polish Legions. During the fighting in 1914–1915, he was promoted to lieutenant, and after the war, he was awarded the V-Class Virtuti Militari. In August 1915, he moved to the special group in Warsaw. Soon he became an aide-de-camp to Józef Piłsudski. In 1918, he was sent on a mission to Russia. He was given three tasks: persuade General Józef Haller's army, then in the Ukraine, to back Piłsudski (he failed in this task); reach the French military mission in Moscow under General Lavergne (he succeeded in this task); and return from Moscow to Paris to liaise with the government there. Unfortunately, he was arrested by the Soviet Cheka as a member of the Polish Military Organisation while on a French diplomatic train on its way from Moscow to Murmansk (and Paris). He was imprisoned in the Taganka prison. He was freed thanks to the intervention of his future wife, Bronisława Wieniawa-Długoszowska, with the much-feared Cheka operative Yakovleva, then in charge of the prison. Bronisława, née Kliatchkin, was at that time married to the lawyer Leon Berenson, the lawyer of Felix Dzerzhinsky, the head of the Cheka. She was a Lutheran, her family having converted from the Jewish faith when she was eight. He married her in a Lutheran ceremony on 2 October 1919 at Lutheran zbór in Nowy Gawłów. The marriage register records the details from her false French passport, including "Lalande" as her maiden name.

As aide-de-camp of Józef Piłsudski during the Polish-Soviet War, he helped him organise the Vilna Operation and Battle of Warsaw. He was also a commander of the 1st Cavalry Division. After the war, Wieniawa was awarded many medals (including the Légion d'honneur, Cross of Valour and Cross of Independence).

Throughout the interwar years, he was a key figure in Warsaw's literary and social life. He had a table reserved for him with leading Warsaw literary figures, such as Julian Tuwim and Jan Lechoń, at the mezzanine of the café Mała Ziemiańska. In a famous anecdote, Aleksander Wat recounts how, when Wat was imprisoned, by the government of the Second Polish Republic for his literary activities (he was the publisher of the crypto-communist magazine Miesięcznik Literacki), he received, in prison, a hamper of vodka and caviar from Wieniawa. The purpose of that story, in Wats' memoirs "My century", is to contrast his treatment at the hands of the Second Polish Republic with the vicious and barbaric treatment he was to receive in Soviet prisons during the war. Even though duels were officially declared illgeal in 1920, Długoszowski was known to take part in them on a couple of occasions.

In November 1921, Wieniawa became the Polish military attaché in Bucharest, Romania. He was associated with making the Polish-Romanian convention, which was signed in 1922. In 1926, he passed his exams at the High War School. He soon became a commander of 1 Pułk Szwoleżerów Józefa Piłsudskiego, the most prestigious and representative Polish cavalry division, which he commanded until 1930.

During the May Coup of 1926, he was one of Piłsudski's officers who helped him to organise the coup.

In 1930–1932, he was commander of I Cavalry Division and, for some time, of II Cavalry Division. In 1932, he was promoted by President Ignacy Mościcki to the rank of Brigadier General. He was commander of the II Cavalry Division, from 1932 to 14 May 1938. In 1938, he was promoted to Major-General, Generał dywizji. From 1938 to 13 June 1940, he was the Polish Ambassador in Rome.

== One-day presidency ==
On 17 September 1939, he was nominated president of Poland by the retiring President Ignacy Mościcki. On the same day, Poland was invaded by the Soviet Union, and he took the train from Rome to Paris to take on his new role. His appointment was published in the Official Journal, Monitor Polski, on 25 September 1939. His appointment was blackballed by the French Third Republic and also opposed by Władysław Sikorski. After the capitulation of France, he emigrated to New York City by travelling via Lisbon.

Many sources do not list Wieniawa as president but merely as "designated successor". However, according to the then constitution, when the President cannot execute his powers (as when Mościcki was interned in Romania and it was clear that he would not be released unless he resigned), the designated successor automatically became president.

After receiving an appointment or becoming president, Wieniawa-Długoszowski asked Cardinal August Hlond to become Prime Minister. Hlond refused and referred to Wieniawa as "Mr President".

Also, in a press statement from President Lech Wałęsa's press secretary on 21 September 1994 to Dziennik Polski, Wieniawa-Długoszowski was referred to as one of the legitimate presidents-in-exile.

According to some opinions, Mościcki had meant to pass his office to Wieniawa-Długoszowski as caretaker until the office could be assumed by a candidate acceptable to both Sanacja and opposition circles, General Kazimierz Sosnkowski, whose whereabouts were unknown in September 1939. Finally, after Wieniawa's resignation, a compromise candidate, Władysław Raczkiewicz, was chosen.

=== Death ===
Once in the United States, Wieniawa-Długoszowski settled in New York City. He was unable to get any position in the Polish Army from Władysław Sikorski since he was part of the Piłsudskiist Sanation Movement, which had ruled Poland from 1926 to 1939, which Sikorski had opposed (having organised a coup against Wieniawa in 1939). He moved to Detroit, where he was appointed editor-in-chief of Frank Januszewski's Dziennik Polski (Detroit). Finally, on 18 April 1942, Sikorski appointed Wieniawa minister plenipotentiary to the governments of Cuba, Dominican Republic and Haiti, based in Havana. On 20 June 1942 the National Committee of Americans of Polish Extraction (KNAPP) was founded in New York, with Wieniawa listed as a founder. KNAPP was strongly for retaining Poland's eastern territories, was critical of Sikorski, and was entirely distrustful of Stalin. Wieniawa, after moving back to New York, caught between these two opposing forces, committed suicide on 1 July 1942. Some sources says he committed suicide by leaping from an upper story of his New York City residence at 3 Riverside Drive, but the exact details of his death are debated among historians. He left a suicide note. One month later, on 14 August 1942, the Jewish ghetto in his home village of Bobowa was liquidated; about 700 inhabitants were killed in a mass execution in the Garbacz Forest.

Wieniawa's remains were brought back to Kraków for reburial in the Rakowicki Cemetery, on 27 September 1990, where he now lies with his fallen comrades from World War I Polish Legions.

== Honours and awards ==
=== Polish ===
- Silver Cross of Order of Virtuti Militari (17 May 1922)
- Commander's Cross with Star of Order of Polonia Restituta (10 November 1938)
- Commander's Cross of Order of Polonia Restituta (16 March 1934)
- Cross of Independence with Swords (12 May 1931)
- Officer's Cross of Order of Polonia Restituta (10 November 1928)
- Cross of Valour (four times)
- Golden Cross of Merit (17 March 1930)
- Commemorative Medal for the War of 1918–1921
- Golden Academic Laurel (7 November 1936)
- Medal of the Tenth Anniversary of Regained Independence
- Silver Medal for Long Service
- Bronze Medal for Long Service

=== Foreign ===
- Grand Decoration of Honour for Services to the Republic of Austria (Austria))
- Grand Officer of Order of Saints Maurice and Lazarus (Italy)
- Commander's Cross with Star of Hungarian Order of Merit (Hungary
- Commander of Order of the Star of Romania (Romania)
- Commander of the Order of the White Eagle (Yugoslavia)
- Commander of Order of the Three Stars (Latvia)
- Medal of the 10th Anniversary of the War of Independence (Latvia)
- Commander of Legion of Honour (France)
- Officer of Legion of Honour (France)
- 1914–1918 Inter-Allied Victory medal

== Bibliography ==
=== By Wieniawa ===
- Grabska, Elżbieta; Pytasz, Marek, eds. (1998). Szuflada generała Wieniawy : wiersze i dokumenty : materiały do twórczości i biografii Bolesława Wieniawy-Długoszowskiego. Warszawa: Państwowy Instytut Wydawniczy. ISBN 978-83-06-02719-8.
- Wieniawa-Długoszowski, Bolesław (1992). Wymarsz i inne wspomnienia. Warszawa: Biblioteka "Więzi". ISBN 978-83-85124-09-2.
- Wieniawa-Długoszowski, Bolesław (2002). Wiersze i piosenki. Papier-service. ISBN 978-83-917625-1-6.
- Wieniawa-Długoszowski, Bolesław (1938). Introduction in "Księga Jazdy Polskiej". Warszawa: Fundacja Niepodległościowa. pp. 9–14.
- Dupont, Marcel (1993). Generał Lasalle. Translated by Wieniawa-Długoszowski. Kraków: Małopolska Oficyna Wydawnicza Krak-Buch. ISBN 978-83-85844-08-2. OCLC 749733756.
- Dupont, Marcel (2014). Szable w garść! : dziesięć bojów kawaleryjskich (Sabre au poing! : Dix combats de cavalerie). Translated by Wieniawa-Długoszowski, Bolesław. Napoleon V.
- Wieniawa-Długoszowski, Bolesław; Chudek, Józef Marian (1957). Z raportów ambasadorskich Wieniawy-Długoszowskiego. Warsaw: Polski Instytut Spraw Międzynarodowych. OCLC 69298008.
- Wieniawa-Długoszowski, Bolesław. Materiały archiwalne dotyczące Bolesława Wieniawy-Długoszowskiego (Manuscript Document, Archival Material, Wiersze, listy, wycinki prasowe, fotokopie, artykuły). Warsaw: National Library of Poland, Biblioteka Narodowa. OCLC 1042540590.
- Wieniawa-Długoszowski, Bolesław; Emil Młynarski (1928). Moja para : piosenka ułańska na głos z fortep (with musical score). Stołeczny Komitet Obchodu Dziesięciolecia Odrodzenia Polski.
- Wieniawa-Długoszowski, Bolesław; Rudnicki, Klemens (1937). Operacyjna użyteczność kawalerii w świetle historii. Warszawa: Wojsk. Instytut Nauk.-Oświat. OCLC 899921843.
- Wieniawa-Długoszowski, Bolesław (1932). Ze wspomnień legjonowych. Warszawa: Wydawnictwo "Świat przez Radjo".

=== Wieniawa's songs ===
- Wieniawa-Długoszowski, Bolesław; Królikiewicz, Adam (1936). Jeździec i koń w terenie i w skoku : metody przygotowania i zaprawy. Warszawa: Główna Księgarnia Wojskowa. OCLC 749907458.
- Wieniawa-Długoszowski, B. (1935). "Moje piosenki". Muzyka (5–7).
- Wieniawa-Długoszowski, Bolesław (1935). "Józef Piłsudski w muzyce i pieśni". Muzyka (5–7).
- Makowska, Monika. "Poetic works of the first uhlan of the interwar Poland in the period of the Legions" (PDF). UNIWERSYTETU JAGIELLOŃSKIEGO.

=== About Wieniawa ===
The first book in this list is both the most recent and the most comprehensive.

- Parowicz, Izabella; Kolmasiak, Mariusz (2026). Generał Bolesław Wieniawa-Długoszowski 1881–1942. Warsaw: Instytut Pamięci Narodowej. ISBN 978-83-8376-970-7.
- Majchrowski, Jacek M. (1990). Ulubieniec Cezara B.Wieniawa Długoszowski. Wroclaw: Zakład Narodowy im Ossolińskich. ISBN 978-83-04-03433-4.
- Majchrowski, Jacek M. (1993). Gen. Bolesław Wieniawa Długoszowski - pierwszy ułan Drugiej Rzeczypospolitej. Warszawa: Polska Oficyna Wydawnicza "BGW". ISBN 978-83-7066-347-6.
- Vernon, Gervase (2013). Belonging and Betrayal. CreateSpace Independent Publishing Platform. ISBN 978-1-4825-6684-0.
- Wittlin, Tadeusz (1996). Szabla i Koń. London: Polska Fundacja Kulturalna. ISBN 978-0-85065-267-3.
- Grochowalski, Wojciech (2001). Ku chwale Wieniawy: W 120 rocznicę urodzin. Papier-Service. ISBN 978-83-905425-6-0.
- Wołos, Mariusz (2000). Generał dywizji Bolesław Wieniawa-Długoszowski Biografia wojskowa. Toruń: Adam Marszalek. ISBN 978-83-7174-785-4.
- Dworzyński, Witold (1993). Wieniawa poeta żołnierz dyplomata. Warszawa: Wydwnictwa Szkolne i Pedagogiczne. ISBN 978-83-02-05029-9.
- Urbanek, Mariusz (1991). Wieniawa. Szwoleżer na Pegazie. Wrocław: Wydawnictwo Iskry. ISBN 978-83-7023-076-0.
- Romański, Romuald (2011). Generał Bolesław Wieniawa-Długoszowski. Polityk czy lew salonowy?. Warszawa: Bellona. ISBN 978-83-11-12037-2.

=== Books about his period in France 1907-1914 ===
- Grabska, Elżbieta; et al., eds. (1996). Autour de Bourdelle : Paris et les artistes polonais, 1900-1918. Paris: Paris-Musées. ISBN 978-2-87900-319-1.
- Żurawska, Beata (2009). "Bolesław Wieniawa-Długoszowski. Literature. Ułan. Dyplomata" (PDF). Historic@. 5. Archived from the original (PDF) on 25 February 2019.
- Ostrowska-Grabska, Halina (1978). Bric à brac 1848-1939. Warsaw: Państwowy Instytut Wydawniczy.
- Statut Towarzystwa Artystów Polskich w Paryżu. Paris: A. Reiffa. 1911.

=== Books about the period as ambassador in Rome and the "President for a day" episode ===
- Romeyko, Marian (1969). Wspomnienia o Wieniawie i o rzymskich czasach. Warszawa: Ministerstwo Obrony Narodowej. ISBN 978-83-11-07754-6.
- Wieniawa-Długoszowski, Bolesław; Chudek, Józef Marian (1957). Z raportów ambasadorskich Wieniawy-Długoszowskiego. Warsaw: Polski Instytut Spraw Międzynarodowych. OCLC 69298008.
- Beauvois, Yves (2001). Leon Noel, de Laval à de Gaulle (1888-1987). Paris: Presses Universitaires du Septentrion. pp. 172–174. ISBN 978-2-85939-646-6.
- Beauvois, Yves (1989). Les relations franco-polonaises pendant la drôle de guerre. Paris: L'Harmattan. ISBN 978-2-7384-0156-4.
- Lukasiewicz, Juliusz (1989). Dyplomata w Paryzu 1936-1939: Wspomnienia i dokumenty Juliusza ¡ukasiewicza ambasadora rzeczypospolitej Polskiej. London: Polska Fundacja Kulturalna. ISBN 978-0-85065-169-0.
- Strzałka, Krzysztof (2007). "Rozmowy Bolesława Wieniawy-Długoszowskiego z Galeazzo Ciano w okresie 1939-1940". Sprawy Międzynarodowe. 3 (LX): 103–140.
- Strzałka, Krzysztof (2001). Między przyjaźnią a wrogością. Z dziejów stosunków polsko-włoskich (1939-1945). Kraków: Arcana).

=== Books about his period in America ===
- Jaroszynska-Kirchmann, Anna (2004). The Exile Mission: The Polish Political Diaspora and Polish Americans, 1939–1956. Athens, Ohio: Ohio University Press. p. 47. ISBN 0821415271.
- Pula, James (1995). Polish Americans; an ethnic community. New York: Twayne Publishers. p. 88. ISBN 0805784381.

=== Books mainly of photographs ===
- Maciejewicz, Anna; et al. (2013). Bolesław Ignacy Florentyn Wieniawa-Długoszowski. Warszawa: Centralne Archiwum Wojskowe. ISBN 978-83-934259-7-6. OCLC 890389923.
- Vernon, Gervase (2019). Wieniawa's honours and certificates. London: Photobox. Archived from the original on 14 May 2021.

=== Films Wieniawa helped to make ===
- Wieniawa-Długoszowski, Bolesław; Goetel, Ferdinand. "UŁANI, UŁANI, CHŁOPCY MALOWANI. (1932)".
- Wieniawa-Długoszowski, Bolesław. "ŚLUBY UŁAŃSKIE. (1923)".

=== Films about Wieniawa ===
- Wawer, Zbigniew. "BOLESŁAW WIENIAWA-DŁUGOSZOWSKI. ŻOŁNIERZ I POETA". (1992) FilmPolski.
- Adamski, Zygmunt. "PIERWSZY UŁAN DRUGIEJ RZECZYPOSPOLITEJ". (1994) YouTube. Archived from the original on 12 December 2021.
- Gajewski, Grzegorz. "Powrót Wieniawy". (1990) YouTube.
- Gajewski, Grzegorz. "WIENIAWA". (2018) FilmPolski.

Political offices
Preceded by Ignacy Mościcki	President of the Polish Republic; 1939	Succeeded by Władysław Raczkiewicz
