= Léon Dostert =

French-born American scholar of languages (1904–1971)

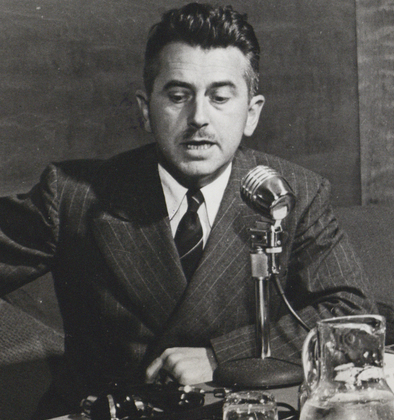
- Dostert in 1946
- Born: May 14, 1904
- Died: September 1, 1971 (aged 67)

Léon Dostert (May 14, 1904 – September 1, 1971) was a French-born American scholar of languages and a pivotal proponent of machine translation. He was responsible for enduring innovations in interpretation, such as the simultaneous, head-set method used at the Nuremberg Trials, which is still used today at international gatherings and international institutions like the United Nations, the Council of Europe, the European Commission and the European Parliament.

== Early life and education ==
Born in Longwy, France, at the beginning of the twentieth century, Dostert's foreign-language capabilities became apparent during a childhood affected by World War I. His village on the Belgian border was overrun by the German army during that conflagration before being liberated by its American counterpart, and Dostert had mastered both German and English before the end of hostilities. Such was his command of both languages, he worked as a translator for both the Germans and the Americans.

Orphaned before the outbreak of war, Dostert was well liked by the American troops he worked for – so much so, in fact, that a few of them sponsored his education in the United States after the war. In 1921, after recovering from war-related ill-health, Dostert enrolled in a high school in Pasadena, California. He entered Occidental College in 1925, before moving to Georgetown University a few years later, where in 1928 he gained a BS in foreign service. Another bachelor's degree, in philosophy, followed in 1930, and a master's in 1931. Dostert was accepted as a PhD student in languages at Johns Hopkins, though he never finished his thesis.

== Wartime service ==
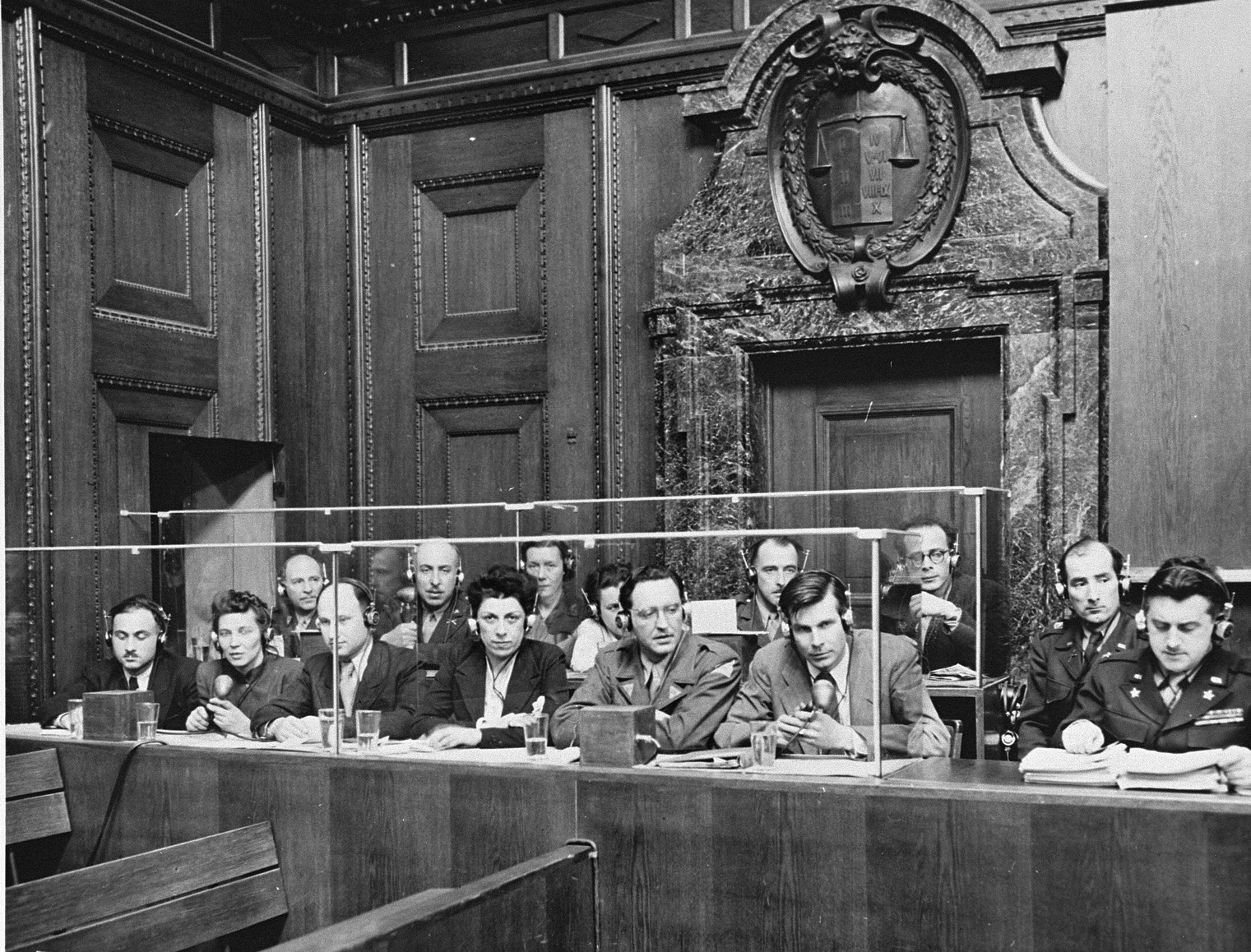
right: Dostert

Dostert by 1945 had been appointed to the rank of colonel in the U.S. Army, and served at SHAEF headquarters as director of the Translation Office. It is noted in the WWII Diary of Lt. Gen. John C. H. Lee, commanding general of logistics and the Communications Zone, ETO that on 14 June 1945 he was present at the Arc de Triomphe. Gen. Charles de Gaulle decorated Gen. of the Army Dwight D. Eisenhower with the French Order of Liberation. Lee noted that Eisenhower "made a very fine speech which was exceedingly well translated into French by Colonel Dostert." Dostert was responsible for translation at the Nuremberg Trials, creating and staffing the series of sound booths where soldiers would hear the speaker in any language, and translate it to either English or German for the prosecution, defense, and supervision of the Tribunal.

== Machine translation ==
Dostert became the inaugural head of Georgetown's Institute of Languages and Linguistics. The Institute would collaborate with IBM to perform the first ever machine translation, which was publicly demonstrated in 1954. Dostert himself announced the achievement, though the public event itself was more a proof of concept to garner further interest and resources.

== Bibliography ==
- Gordin, Michael D. (2015). Scientific Babel: The Language of Science from the Fall of Latin to the Rise of English. London: Profile Books. ISBN 978-1-781-25114-0.
- Walker, Paul Robert (Fall 2015). "The Trials and Triumphs of Leon Dostert '28". Occidental Magazine. Archived from the original on May 4, 2016.
