= IBM 3850 =

The IBM 3850 Mass Storage System (MSS) was an online tape library used to hold large amounts of infrequently accessed data. It was one of the earliest examples of nearline storage.

== History ==
Starting in the late-1960s IBM's lab in Boulder, Colorado began development of a low-cost mass storage system based on magnetic tape cartridges. The tapes would be accessed automatically by a robot (known as an accessor) and fed into a reader/writer unit that could work on several tapes at the same time. Originally the system was going to be used as a directly attached memory device, but as the speed of computers grew in relation to the storage, the product was re-purposed as an automated system that would offload little-used data from hard disk systems. Known internally as Comanche while under development, IBM management found a number of niche uses for the concept, and announced it officially as the IBM 3850 on October 9, 1974. After more than a decade (comparable to the IBM 2321 Data Cell, 1964–1975), it was withdrawn August 5, 1986.

== Description ==
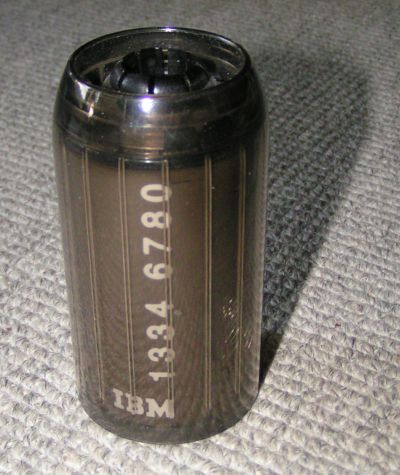
A data cartridge

The Mass Storage System consisted of a library of cylindrical plastic cartridges, two inches wide and 4 inches (100 mm) long, each holding a spool of tape 770 inches (20 m) long storing 50 MB; each virtual disk required a pair of cartridges. These cartridges were held in a hexagonal array of bins in the IBM 3851 Mass Storage Facility. New cartridges were rolled into the facility and were automatically stored in a vacant bin. The data were accessed via virtual IBM 3330 disk drives, and physically cached on a combination of 3330 and 3350 (Note: The 3851 did not support 3350 staging drives formatted in native mode, only 3350 drives formatted as 3330.) staging drives, the data being transferred automatically between cartridge and disk drive in processes called staging and destaging. These were all connected together with the IBM 3830 Storage Control (also used for disk storage alone), the entire system making up a 3850 unit.

Cartridges were moved into and out of read stations by two motorized accessor arms, electrically connected via flat cable on a drum. Stage time for data from cartridge to disk was typically 15 seconds, including about two seconds to move the cartridge into a read station, and eight to ten seconds to read the 200-foot tape.

The recording method was unusual for its time. The drive pulled the tape from the cartridge and wound it once around a cylindrical mandrel in a helix, then stopped the tape. The drive's head, mounted on a rotating drum, then rotated once to read or record a diagonal track. The drive then wound the tape a small step forward and the head rotated to do the next track. Depending on technical definitions this might be even considered a first example of a digital helical scan recording, long before Exabyte's helical drive (which was based on analog video helical recording systems developed earlier).

When free disk space was required a group of cylinders were selected to be destaged to tape, these were transferred with minimal or no change of format. Each tape could store 202 cylinder images of 19 tracks each, half of the 404 cylinders in a 3330 disk pack. Cylinder locations on the tape were fixed and identified by markers along the edge.

== Models ==
Several models of the 3851 were available. The smallest A1 holding 706 cartridges storing 35.3GB, while the largest A4 held 4,720 cartridges storing 236GB in a 20-foot (6.1 m) long unit. All of the units were also available in the "B models" which added a second controller for on-line backups, as well as offline storage. A second series was released on March 6, 1980, doubling maximum capacity to 472GB. The entire series was discontinued on August 5, 1986.
