= Isabel Trancoso =

Portuguese computer scientist

Isabel Maria Martins Trancoso is a Portuguese computer scientist specializing in speech processing. She was a full professor in the Instituto Superior Técnico, a former president of the scientific council of INESC-ID, the former editor-in-chief of IEEE Transactions on Speech and Audio Processing, and a former president of the International Speech Communication Association.

== Education and career ==
Trancoso studied electrical and computer engineering at the Instituto Superior Técnico (IST), earning a licenciatura in 1979, master's degree in 1984, and PhD in 1987. Her doctoral dissertation, High Quality Medium-To-Low Bit Rate Speech Coding, was supervised by José Tribolet.

She continued at IST as an assistant professor from 1987 to 1993, associate professor from 1993 to 2005, and full professor since 2005. From 2007 to 2011, she was president of the International Speech Communication Association. She retired in 2022.

== Recognition ==
Trancoso was elected as an IEEE Fellow in 2011, "for sustained contributions to speech technology, especially in the provision of research in and resources for the Portuguese language". She was named as a Fellow of the International Speech Communication Association (ISCA) in 2014, and in 2024 received the ISCA Medal for Scientific Achievement, "for pioneering contributions to speech coding and resources for the Portuguese language, and sustained service to the speech community".
