= List of research laboratories for machine translation =

The following is a list of research laboratories that focus on machine translation.

== List ==
Parent Organization	Research Laboratory	Type	Headquarters	Ref.
Abdul Majid Bhurgri Institute of Language Engineering	Language Engineering	Governmental	Hyderabad, Sindh Pakistan	
Amazon (company)	Natural Language Processing Group	Corporate	Seattle, United States	
Ben-Gurion University	Natural Language Processing Project	Academic	Beersheba, Israel	
Brigham Young University	Translation Research Group	Academic	Provo, United States	
British Computer Society	Natural Language Translation Specialist Group	Academic	Swindon, England	
Carnegie Mellon University	Language Technologies Institute	Academic	Pittsburgh, United States	
Center for the International Cooperation for Computerization	Machine Translation System Laboratory	Governmental	Tokyo, Japan	
Charles University	Institute of Formal and Applied Linguistics	Academic	Prague, Czech Republic	
Chittagong University of Engineering & Technology	Institute of Modern Language	Academic	Raozan, Bangladesh	
City University of New York	Natural Language Processing Group	Academic	New York City, United States	
Columbia University	Center for Computational Learning Systems	Academic	New York City, United States	
Dublin City University	National Centre for Language Technology	Academic	Dublin, Ireland	
Dublin City University, Dublin Institute of Technology, Trinity College Dublin, University College Dublin	ADAPT Centre	Academic	Dublin, Ireland	
Electronics and Telecommunications Research Institute	Language Intelligence Research Group	Governmental	Daejeon, South Korea	
European Research Area	EuroMatrix	Governmental	Saarbrücken, Germany	
European Research Area	EuroMatrixPlus	Governmental	Saarbrücken, Germany	
Federal Ministry of Education and Research	Verbmobil	Governmental	Bonn, Germany	
Fondazione Bruno Kessler	Human Language Technology	Corporate	Trento, Italy	
German Research Centre for Artificial Intelligence	Language Technology Lab	Corporate	Saarbrücken, Germany	
Ghent University	Language and Translation Technology Team	Academic	Ghent, Belgium	
Google	Natural Language Understanding Team	Corporate	Mountain View, United States	
Harbin Institute of Technology	Machine Intelligence and Translation Lab	Academic	Harbin, China	
Heidelberg University	Department of Computational Linguistics	Academic	Heidelberg, Germany	
Hong Kong University of Science and Technology	Human Language Technology Center	Academic	Clear Water Bay, Hong Kong	
IBM	Natural Language Processing Group	Corporate	North Castle, United States	
Idiap Research Institute	Natural Language Processing Group	Academic	Matigny, Switzerland	
Institute for Infocomm Research	Machine Translation Lab	Governmental	Queenstown, Singapore	
Institute for Language and Speech Processing	Natural Language Processing Group	Academic	Athens, Greece	
Institute for Systems and Computer Engineering	Spoken Language Systems Lab	Academic	Lisbon, Portugal	
IIIT Hyderabad	Language Technologies Research Center	Academic	Hyderabad, India	
IIT Bombay	Center for Indian Language Technology	Academic	Powai, India	
Jadavpur University	Natural Language Processing Laboratory	Academic	Kolkata, India	
Jaume I University	TecnoLeTTra	Academic	Castellón, Spain	
Karlsruhe Institute of Technology	Interactive Systems Laboratory	Academic	Karlsruhe, Germany	
Karlsruhe Institute of Technology	International Center for Advanced Communication Technologies	Academic	Karlsruhe, Germany	
Katholieke Universiteit Leuven	Centre for Computational Linguistics	Academic	Leuven, Belgium	
Laboratoire d'Informatique de Grenoble	Groupe d'Étude pour la Traduction Automatique	Academic	Grenoble, France	
Laboratoire des Sciences du Numérique de Nantes	Traitement Automatique du Langage Naturel	Academic	Nantes, France	
Limsi	Spoken Language Processing Group	Governmental	Orsay, France	
Linköping University	Natural Language Processing Group	Academic	Linköping, Sweden	
LMU Munich	Center for Information and Language Processing	Academic	Munich, Germany	
Macquarie University	Centre for Language Technology	Academic	Sydney, Australia	
Massachusetts Institute of Technology	Lincoln Laboratory	Academic	Lexington, United States	
Microsoft	Machine Translation Group	Corporate	Redmond, United States	
Microsoft	Natural Language Computing Group	Corporate	Beijing, China	
Microsoft	Natural Language Processing Group	Corporate	Redmond, United States	
Ministry of Communications and High Technologies	Dilmanc	Governmental	Baku, Azerbaijan	
Ministry of Finance	Malaysian Institute of Translation & Books	Governmental	Kuala Lumpur, Malaysia	
Nanjing University	Researches on Machine Translation	Academic	Nanjing, China	
Nara Institute of Science and Technology	Augmented Human Communication Laboratory	Academic	Nara, Japan	
National Library of Finland	Finno-Ugric Laboratory for Support of the Electronic Representation of Regional Languages	Governmental	Syktyvkar, Russia	
National Research Council of Canada	Language Technologies Research Centre	Governmental	Ottawa, Canada	
NICT	Advanced Translation Technology Laboratory	Governmental	Seika, Japan	
Nippon Telegraph and Telephone	Linguistic Intelligence Research Group	Corporate	Tokyo, Japan	
North-West University	Centre for Text Technology	Academic	Potchefstroom, South Africa	
Polytechnic University of Catalonia	Center for Language and Speech Technologies and Applications	Academic	Barcelona, Spain	
Polytechnic University of Valencia	Pattern Recognition and Human Language Technology Research Center	Academic	Valencia, Spain	
Pompeu Fabra University	GLiCom	Academic	Barcelona, Spain	
Prompsit	Language Engineering	Corporate	Elche, Spain	
Qatar Computing Research Institute	Arabic Language Technologies Team	Governmental	Doha, Qatar	
Queens College	Algorithms for Computational Linguistics Group	Academic	New York City, United States	
RWTH Aachen University	Human Language Technology and Pattern Recognition Group	Academic	Aachen, Germany	
Saarland University	IAI Saarbrücken	Academic	Saarbrücken, Germany	
Scientific and Technological Research Council of Turkey	Informatics and Information Security Research Center	Governmental	Governmental	
SDL	Research Group	Corporate	Maidenhead, England	
Seoul National University	Computational Linguistics Lab	Academic	Seoul, South Korea	
Simon Fraser University	Natural Language Laboratory	Academic	Burnaby, Canada	
Sharif University of Technology	Natural Language Processing Laboratory	Academic	Tehran, Iran	
SRI International	Speech Technology and Research Laboratory	Corporate	Menlo Park, United States	
Stanford University	Natural Language Processing Group	Academic	Stanford, United States	
Technion	Knowledge Center for Processing Hebrew	Academic	Haifa, Israel	
Tilburg University	Induction of Linguistic Knowledge Group	Academic	Tilburg, Netherlands	
Tilde Company	Tilde Research	Corporate	Riga, Latvia	
Université de Montréal	Applied Research in Computational Linguistics	Academic	Montreal, Canada	
University of Alicante	Traducens Group	Academic	San Vicente del Raspeig, Spain	
University of Amsterdam	Institute for Logic, Language and Computation	Academic	Amsterdam, Netherlands	
University of Amsterdam	Statistical Language Processing and Learning Lab	Academic	Amsterdam, Netherlands	
University of Caen Normandy	GREYC	Academic	Caen, France	
University of California, Berkeley	Natural Language Processing Group	Academic	Berkeley, United States	
University of Cambridge	Machine Intelligence Laboratory Speech Research Group	Academic	Cambridge, England	
University of Cambridge	Natural Language and Information Processing Research Group	Academic	Cambridge, England	
University of Copenhagen	Centre for Language Technology	Academic	Copenhagen, Denmark	
University of Edinburgh	Statistical Machine Translation Group	Academic	Edinburgh, Scotland	
University of Essex	Language and Computation Group	Academic	Colchester, England	
University of Geneva	Department of Translation Technology	Academic	Geneva, Switzerland	
University of Gothenburg	Centre for Language Technology	Academic	Gothenburg, Sweden	
University of Groningen	Computational Linguistics Group	Academic	Groningen, Netherlands	
University of Haifa	Computational Linguistics Group	Academic	Haifa, Israel	
University of Illinois	Natural Language Research	Academic	Urbana, United States	
University of Macau	Natural Language Processing & Portuguese-Chinese; Machine Translation Laboratory	Academic	Taipa, Macau	
University of Maine	Language and Speech Technology	Academic	Le Mans, France	
University of Manchester	Centre for Computational Linguistics	Academic	Manchester, England	
University of Maryland, College Park	Computational Linguistics and Information Processing Laboratory	Academic	College Park, United States	
University of Melbourne	Natural Language Processing Group	Academic	Parkville, Australia	
University of Notre Dame	Natural Language Processing Group	Academic	Notre Dame, United States	
University of Pennsylvania	Natural Language Processing Group	Academic	Philadelphia, United States	
University of Rochester	Machine Translation Research	Academic	Rochester, United States	
University of Science, Malaysia	Computer-Aided Translation Unit	Academic	Penang, Malaysia	
University of Sheffield	Natural Language Processing Group	Academic	Sheffield, England	
University of Southern California	Information Sciences Institute	Academic	Marina del Rey, United States	
University of Southern Denmark	Visual Interactive Syntax Learning	Academic	Slagelse, Denmark	
University of Stuttgart	Institute for Natural Language Processing	Academic	Stuttgart, Germany	
University of Sydney	Language Technology Research Group	Academic	Sydney, Australia	
University of Tartu	Natural Language Processing Research Group	Academic	Tartu, Estonia	
University of the Basque Country	IXA Group	Academic	San Sebastián, Spain	
University of Tokyo	Tsuruoka Laboratory	Academic	Tokyo, Japan	
University of Toronto	Computational Linguistics Research Group	Academic	Toronto, Canada	
University of Tromsø	Giellatekno	Academic	Tromsø, Norway	
University of Washington	Signal, Speech and Language Interpretation Lab	Academic	Seattle, United States	
University of Wolverhampton	Research Group in Computational Linguistics	Academic	Wolverhampton, England	
University of Zagreb	Institute of Linguistics	Academic	Zagreb, Croatia	
University of Zurich	Institute of Computational Linguistics	Academic	Zürich, Switzerland	
Uppsala University	Language Technology and Computational Linguistics	Academic	Uppsala, Sweden	
Xerox Research Centre Europe	Natural Language Processing Group	Corporate	Meylan, France	
Xiamen University	Natural Language Processing Group	Academic	Xiamen, China	
Ho Chi Minh City University of Information Technology	Natural Language Processing Group	Academic	Ho Chi Minh City, Vietnam	

== See also ==
- Asia-Pacific Association for Machine Translation
- Association for Machine Translation in the Americas
- European Association for Machine Translation
