= List of research institutes in Greece =

This is a list of research institutes in Greece.

== State-run institutes ==
- "Athena" Research and Innovation Center in ICT and Knowledge Technologies (formerly KETEP/IRIS)
  - Industrial Systems Institute (INBIS/ISI)
  - Institute for Language and Speech Processing (ILSP)
  - Information Management Systems Institute (IMSI - formerly known as Institute for the Management of Information Systems IMIS)
  - Hellenic Technology Clusters Initiative "Corallia"
- Academy of Athens
  - Foundation for Biomedical Research of the Academy of Athens
  - Research Centre for Modern Greek Dialects
  - Hellenic Folklore Research Centre
  - Center of Research for Medieval and Modern Hellenism
  - Research Center for the History of Greek Law
  - Center of Research into the History of Modern Hellenism
  - Research Center for Greek and Latin Literature
  - Research Centre for Greek Philosophy
  - Research Centre for Atmospheric Physics and Climatology
  - Research Center for Antiquity
  - Center of Research into Greek Society
  - Research Centre for Byzantine and Post-Byzantine Art
  - Research Center for Scientific Terms and Neologisms
  - Research Center for Astronomy and Applied Mathematics
  - Research Center of Pure and Applied Mathematics
- Biomedical Sciences Research Center (BSRC) "Alexander Fleming"
- Center for European Constitutional Law (CECL)
- Center for the Greek Language
- Center of International & European Economic Law (CIEEL)
- Centre of Planning and Economic Research (KEPE)
- Center for Research and Technology Hellas (CERTH)
  - Chemical Process & Energy Resources Institute (CPERI)
  - Hellenic Institute of Transport (HIT)
  - Information Technologies Institute (ITI)
  - Institute for Solid Fuels Technology and Applications (ISFTA)
  - Institute of Applied Biosciences (INAB)
  - Institute for Research & Technology of Thessaly (IRETETH)
- Center for Renewable Energy Sources (CRES)
- Centre for Plasma Physics and Lasers, T.E.I. of Crete
- Centre for Technological Research of Crete (CTR-C)
- Computer Technology Institute and Press "Diophantus"
- Education Research Centre
- Eugenides Foundation
- Exports' Research and Studies Institute (IEES)
- Institute of Optics and Vision (IVO)
- National Agricultural Research Foundation (NAGREF)
- National Engineering Research Institute of Greece (NERIG)
  - Animal Research Institute
  - Institute of Viticulture, Vegetable crops and Floriculture of Heraklion
  - Institute of Agricultural Machinery and Constructions
  - Forest Research Institute
  - Veterinary Research Institute
  - Hellenic Institute of Apiculture
  - Cereal Institute
  - Institute of Mediterranean Forest Ecosystems & Forest Products Technology
  - Institute of Subtropical Plants and Olive Tree of Chania
- National Hellenic Research Foundation (EIE) - Athens
- Foundation for Economic and Industrial Research (IOBE)
- Foundation for Research & Technology - Hellas (FORTH)
  - Institute of Applied Computational Mathematics (IACM)
  - Institute of Astrophysics (IA)
  - Institute of Chemical Engineering & High Temperature Processes (ICE/HT)
  - Institute of Computer Science (ICS)
  - Institute of Electronic Structure and Laser (IESL)
  - Institute of Mediterranean Studies (IMS)
  - Institute of Molecular Biology & Biotechnology (IMBB)
    - Biomedical Research Division (BRD)
  - Institute of Petroleum Research
- Hellenic Geological Institute
- Hellenic Institute of International & Foreign Law
- Hellenic Centre for Marine Research (NCMR)
  - Institute of Oceanography
  - Institute of Aquaculture
  - Institute of Marine Biological Resources
  - Institute of Inland Waters
  - Institute of Marine Biology and Genetics
- Hellenic Institute for Occupational Health and Safety (ELINYAE)
- Hellenic Pasteur Institute - Athens
- Institute of Biomedical Technology (INBIT)
- Institute of Communication & Computer Systems (ICCS)
- Institute of Geology and Mineral Exploration
- Institute of International Relations (IIR)
- Institute for International Economic Relations (IIER)
- Mediterranean Agronomic Institute of Chania
- National Center for Social Research (EKKE)
- National Observatory of Athens
  - Institute for Astronomy, Astrophysics, Space Applications and Remote Sensing
  - Institute of Geodynamics
  - Institute for Environmental research and Sustainable Development
- National Centre of Scientific Research "Demokritos" - Athens
  - Institute of Informatics and Telecommunications
  - Institute of Biosciences and Applications
  - Institute of Nuclear and Radiological Sciences, Energy, Technology and Safety
  - Institute of Advanced Materials, Physicochemical Processes, Nanotechnology & Microsystems
  - Institute of Nuclear and Particle Physics
- National School of Public Health
- Research Centre for Equal Opportunities (KETHI)
- Society for Social and Economic Studies (EKOME)
- Space Internetworking Center (SPICE)
- Telecommunication Systems Institute
- University Research Institute of Social Insurance, Health & Assistance (EPIKAYP)

== Private institutes ==
- Adhesives Research Institute (ARI Ltd), today Chimar Hellas
- Alfa Institute of Biomedical Sciences (AIBS) www.aibs.gr
- The American College of Greece Research Center (ACG-RC)
- American School of Classical Studies at Athens (ASCSA) ascsa.edu.gr
- Athens Information Technology (AIT)
- Center for International Strategic Analyses (KEDISA)
- Cognitive Systems Research Institute (CSRI) csri.gr
- Libre Space Foundation (LSF)

== See also ==
- Open access in Greece to scholarly communication
