= Center for the Evaluation of Language and Communication Technologies =

Italian organisation of language technology evalutations (2003-2013)

The Center for the Evaluation of Language and Communication Technologies (CELCT) was an organisation devoted to the evaluation of language technologies, located in Povo, Trento (Italy).

CELCT was established in 2003 by FBK (Fondazione Bruno Kessler) and DFKI (Deutsches Forschungszentrum für Künstliche Intelligenz), and was funded by the Autonomous Province of Trento. The goals of CELCT were "to set up infrastructures and develop skills in order to operate successfully in the field of the evaluation of language and communication technologies, becoming a reference point in the field at the national and European levels." CELCT interpreted its mission by carrying out several activities in the field of HLT evaluation, mainly focusing on the organization of national and international evaluation campaigns and on the creation of speech and text corpora in different languages and at different linguistic annotation levels.

CELCT's activities were closed on December 31, 2013. The staff working at CELCT at the time of its closure is continuing their research activities within FBK.

== European projects ==
- TOSCA-MP: Task-oriented search and content annotation for media production
- EXCITEMENT: EXploring Customer Interactions through Textual EntailMENT
- PROMISE: Participative Research labOratory for Multimedia and Multilingual Information Systems Evaluation
- TrebleCLEF: Evaluation, Best Practice & Collaboration for Multilingual Information Access
- EuroMatrix: Statistical and Hybrid Machine Translation Between All European Languages

== Other projects ==
- LiveMemories: Active Digital Memories of Collective Life - Project funded by the Autonomous Province of Trento
- OntoText: From Text to Knowledge for the Semantic Web - Project funded by the Autonomous Province of Trento
- Law Making Environment - Project in collaboration with Consiglio Nazionale delle Ricerche

== Evaluation campaigns ==
CELCT was involved in the following initiatives devoted to the evaluation of Natural Language Processing tools, collaborating with various organizations and networks of excellence both at the national and international level:

- Document Understanding Conference: DUC 2005
- Multilingual Question Answering Track at CLEF (from 2005 to 2013)
- Recognizing Textual Entailment (RTE) Challenges (from 2005 to 2013)
- International Workshop on Spoken Language Translation: IWSLT 2006, IWSLT 2007, IWSLT 2011, and IWSLT 2012
- Evalita: Evaluation of NLP and Speech Tools for Italian (2007, 2009, 2011)
- Cross-Lingual Textual Entailment task at Semeval (2012 and 2013)

== Publications ==
CELCT produced a number of scientific publications in all its activity fields.
