= Kuniao Browser =

Chinese web browser

- Developers: Beijing Jutianneng Culture Media Co, Ltd.
- Operating system: Android iOS; Microsoft Windows
- Available in: 1 languages
- List of languages Simplified Chinese
- Type: Web browser
- License: Proprietary freeware
- Website: "酷鸟浏览器". Archived from the original on 2019-11-14.

Kuniao Browser (Chinese: 酷鸟浏览器) is a web browser developed by Beijing Jutianneng Culture Media Co, Ltd. It allowed users within mainland China to view filtered versions of certain websites normally blocked by the Great Firewall.

The browser proxy is based in Hong Kong on Tencent Cloud, and could access Google, YouTube, Wikipedia, Facebook, Twitter. It could also search for Tiananmen, Xi Jinping, and other searches that had been blocked, with the only legal search websites being Xinhuanet and China Daily websites. On November 15, 2019, the browser was blocked by the government from accessing websites.
