= Microsoft Translator =

Machine translation cloud service by Microsoft

- Logo and favicon of Microsoft Translator, which appears along the title in the web browser
- Website type: Machine translation
- Available in: 182 languages; see below
- Owner: Microsoft
- Website: microsoft.com/translator bing.com/translator
- IPv6 support: Yes
- Registration: Optional
- Current status: Active

Microsoft Translator or Bing Translator is a multilingual machine translation cloud service provided by Microsoft. Microsoft Translator is a part of Microsoft Cognitive Services and integrated across multiple consumer, developer, and enterprise products, including Bing, Microsoft Office, SharePoint, Microsoft Edge, Microsoft Lync, Yammer, Skype Translator, Visual Studio, and Microsoft Translator apps for Windows, Windows Phone, iPhone and Apple Watch, and Android phone and Android Wear.

Microsoft Translator also offers text and speech translation through cloud services for businesses. Service for text translation via the Translator Text API ranges from a free tier supporting two million characters per month to paid tiers supporting billions of characters per month. Speech translation via Microsoft Speech services is offered based on the time of the audio stream.

The service supports text translation between many languages and language varieties. It also supports several speech translation systems that currently power the Microsoft Translator live conversation feature, Skype Translator, and Skype for Windows Desktop, and the Microsoft Translator Apps for iOS and Android.

== Development ==
=== History ===
The first version of Microsoft's machine translation system was developed between 1999 and 2000 within Microsoft Research. This system was based on semantic predicate-argument structures known as logical forms (LF) and was spun from the grammar correction feature developed for Microsoft Word. This system was eventually used to translate the entire Microsoft Knowledge Base into Spanish, French, German, and Japanese.

Microsoft's approach to machine translation, like most modern machine translation systems, is "data driven": rather than relying on writing explicit rules to translate natural language, algorithms are trained to understand and interpret translated parallel texts, allowing them to automatically learn how to translate new natural language text. Microsoft's experience with the LF system led directly to a treelet translation system that simplified the LF to dependency trees and eventually to an order template model, significantly improving in speed and enabling the incorporation of new target languages.

The consumer-facing translation site known as Bing Translator (previously known as Windows Live Translator) was launched in 2007 and provides free text and website translations on the web. Text is translated directly within the Bing Translator webpage while websites are translated through the Bilingual Viewer tools.

In 2011, the service was extended to include numerous Microsoft Translator products through a cloud-based application programming interface, which supports products available to both consumer and enterprise users. An additional speech translation capability was introduced in March 2016.

In May 2018, an update to the API was introduced. This new version offered neural machine translation as the default method of translating. In addition to translation, the new version features transliteration and a bilingual dictionary to look up words to find alternative translations and view examples in sentences.

Speech translation was integrated into Microsoft Speech services in September 2018, providing end-to-end speech, speech-to-text, and text-to-speech translation.

=== Translation methodology and research ===
Microsoft Translator uses machine translation to create instantaneous translations from one natural language to another. This system is based on four distinct areas of computer learning research seen below.

Type of learning	Impact on translation
Neural networks Main article: Neural machine translation	Neural networks try to mimic how the brain works to translate between languages. At a high level, neural network translation works in two stages. First, a first stage models the word that needs to be translated based on the context of this word (and its possible translations) within the full sentence. Second, the neural network translates this word model (not the word itself but the model the neural networks built of it), within the context of the sentence, into the other language. Neural machine translation is the default translation method for the Microsoft Translator API.
Syntax-based SMT Main article: Statistical machine translation	Syntax-based translation is based on the idea of translating syntactic units, rather than a word or string of words. Microsoft has used syntax-based SMT to translate much of its computer-related texts from English into multiple target languages. Ongoing research in this area has produced improvements in word inflections and word ordering.
Phrase-based SMT	In phrase-based SMT, the machine learns correspondence between languages from parallel text without the aid of linguist knowledge. This produces better translations in less time than other systems.
Bitext word alignment	SMT systems rely on existing translated data to learn how to automatically translate from one language to another. To train the systems, identifying word correspondences (or word alignments) is crucial. Microsoft has developed work in both discriminative and generative approaches to word alignment, resulting in faster algorithms and higher quality and translations.
Language modeling	Language modeling uses n-gram models to construct comprehensible translations in the target language. This ensures that the output translation is fluent and readable.

=== Accuracy ===
The quality of Microsoft Translator's machine translation outputs are evaluated using a method called the BLEU score.

BLEU (Bilingual Evaluation Understudy) is an algorithm for evaluating the quality of text which has been machine-translated from one natural language to another. Quality is considered to be the correspondence between a machine's output and that of a human. BLEU was one of the first metrics to achieve a high correlation with human judgments of quality, and remains one of the most popular automated and inexpensive metrics.

Because machine translation is based on statistical algorithms rather than human translators, the automatic translations it produces are not always entirely accurate. Microsoft Translator has introduced various feedback features, such as the Collaborative Translation Framework, into its products to allow users to suggest alternative translations. These alternative translations are then integrated into the Microsoft Translator algorithms to improve future translations.

In November 2016, Microsoft Translator introduced translation using deep neural networks in nine of its highest-traffic languages, including all of its speech languages and Japanese. Neural networks provide better translation than industry standard statistical machine learning.

== Core products ==
Microsoft Translator is a cloud-based API that is integrated into numerous Microsoft products and services. The Translator API can be used on its own and can be customized for use in a pre-publishing or post-publishing environment. The API, which is available through subscription, is free for lower translation volumes, and is charged according to a tiered payment system for volumes exceeding two million characters per month. The remaining core products are available for free.

=== Microsoft Translator cloud translation ===
The Microsoft Translator is a cloud-based automatic translation service that can be used to build applications, websites, and tools requiring multi-language support.

- Text translation: The Microsoft Translator Text API can be used to translate text into any of the languages supported by the service.
- Speech translation: Microsoft Translator is integrated into Microsoft Speech services which is an end-to-end REST based API that can be used to build applications, tools, or any solution requiring multi-languages speech translation. Speech to speech translation is available to or from any of the conversation languages, and speech to text translation is available from the conversation languages into any of the Microsoft Translator-supported language systems.

=== Custom Translator ===
Custom Translator is a feature of the Microsoft Translator services that allows enterprises, app developers, and language service providers to build neural translation systems that understand the terminology used in their own business and industry. The customized translations can then be delivered into existing applications, workflows and websites using a normal call to the Microsoft Translator API. Custom Translator can be used when translating text with the Microsoft Translator Text API and when translating speech with Microsoft Speech services.

=== Live feature ===
A personal universal translator that enables up to 500 people to have live, multi-device, multi-language, in-person translated conversations. This feature is currently free and available in the Microsoft Translator apps (Android, iOS or Windows) and from the Microsoft Translator website.

=== Microsoft Translator Hub ===
The Microsoft Translator Hub allows enterprises and language service providers to build their own translation systems that understand business- and industry-specific terminology. The Hub can also be used in conjunction with the CTF, allowing administrators to approve CTF results and add them directly to the Hub. The Microsoft Translator Hub is only available for statistical machine translation and cannot be used with the newest version of the Microsoft Translator API.

The Hub has also been used for language preservation, allowing communities to create their own language translation systems for language and cultural preservation. The Hub has been used to create translation systems for languages such as Hmong, Mayan, Nepali, and Welsh.

=== Multilingual App Toolkit (MAT) ===
The Multilingual App Toolkit (MAT) is an integrated Visual Studio tool, which allows developers to streamline localization workflows of their Windows, Windows Phone and desktop apps. MAT improves localization of file management, translation support, and editing tools.

== Bing Microsoft Translator web app ==
Microsoft Translator
- Website type: Neural machine translation
- Available in: See below
- Owner: Microsoft
- Website: www.bing.com/translator/
- IPv6 support: Yes
- Registration: Optional
- Launched: June 3, 2009; 17 years ago (as Live Search Translator)
- Current status: Active

Bing Microsoft Translator (previously Live Search Translator, Windows Live Translator, and Bing Translator) is a user-facing translation portal provided by Microsoft as part of its Bing services to translate texts or entire web pages into different languages. All translation pairs are powered by the Microsoft Translator, a neural machine translation platform and web service, developed by Microsoft Research, as its backend translation software. Two transliteration pairs (between simplified Chinese and traditional Chinese) are provided by Microsoft's Windows International team.

The Bilingual Viewer showing the English translation of the French Wikipedia's Main Page

Bing Translator can translate phrases entered by the user or acquire a link to a web page and translate it entirely. When translating an entire web page, or when the user selects "Translate this page" in Bing search results, the Bilingual Viewer is shown, which allows users to browse the original web page text and translation in parallel, supported by synchronized highlights, scrolling, and navigation. Four Bilingual Viewer layouts are available:

- Side by side
- Top and bottom
- Original with hover translation
- Translation with hover original

Bing Translator integrates with several other Microsoft products. The following is a table of products into which Bing Translator could be integrated:

Integrates into	Means of integration
Bing Instant Answers	Already integrated
Internet Explorer	An Accelerator for Internet Explorer 8 or higher

== Supported products ==
Through its core product offerings, Microsoft Translator supports the translation features of many Microsoft products at the consumer and enterprise levels. These products fall broadly into three categories—communication products, Microsoft Office, and apps.

=== Communication ===
- Lync
- SharePoint
- Yammer
- Skype Translator

=== Microsoft Office ===
- Excel
- OneNote
- Outlook
- PowerPoint
- Publisher
- Visio
- Word
- Word Online

=== Apps ===
- Web app (translator.microsoft.com)
- Windows and Windows 10
- Windows Phone
- iPhone and Apple Watch
- Android phone and Android Wear
- Kindle Fire
- Skype Translator
- Microsoft Edge
- Microsoft SwiftKey

== Deprecated products ==
=== Collaborative Translation Framework (CTF) ===
The Collaborative Translation Framework (CTF) is an extension of the Microsoft Translator API that allows post-publishing improvement of translated text. By using the CTF, readers have the ability to suggest alternative translations to those provided by the API, or vote on previously offered alternatives. This information is then delivered to the API to improve future translations.

=== Translator Web Widget ===
The Translator Web Widget is a translation tool that can be added to web pages by pasting a predefined snippet of JavaScript code into the page. The web widget is offered for free by Microsoft, and supports both pre-publishing customized translations using the Translator Hub, and post-publishing improvements using the Collaborative Translation Framework.

== Supported languages ==
As of November 2026, Microsoft Translator supports 182 languages and language varieties. The list of supported languages is available at the Microsoft Translator website and can also be retrieved programmatically through the cloud services.

1. Acehnese (Latin) (Note: Web only)
2. Afrikaans
3. Albanian
4. Amharic
5. Arabic
6. Arabic (Egyptian)
7. Arabic (Moroccan)
8. Arabic (Romanized)
9. Armenian
10. Assamese
11. Asturian
12. Azerbaijani
13. Balinese
14. Bangla
15. Bashkir
16. Basque
17. Batak Toba
18. Belarusian
19. Bhojpuri
20. Bikol
21. Bodo
22. Bosnian
23. Bulgarian
24. Cantonese (Traditional)
25. Catalan
26. Cebuano
27. Chhattisgarhi
28. Chinese (Literary)
29. Chinese Simplified
30. Chinese Traditional
31. Corsican
32. Croatian
33. Czech
34. Danish
35. Dari
36. Divehi
37. Dogri
38. Dutch
39. English
40. English (United Kingdom)
41. Esperanto
42. Estonian
43. Faroese
44. Fijian
45. Filipino
46. Finnish
47. French
48. French (Canada)
49. Frisian
50. Friulian
51. Galician
52. Ganda
53. Georgian
54. German
55. Greek
56. Gujarati
57. Haitian Creole
58. Hausa
59. Hebrew
60. Hiligaynon
61. Hindi
62. Hmong Daw
63. Hungarian
64. Iban
65. Icelandic
66. Igbo
67. Ilocano
68. Indonesian
69. Inuinnaqtun
70. Inuktitut
71. Inuktitut (Latin)
72. Irish
73. Italian
74. Jamaican Patois
75. Japanese
76. Javanese
77. Kabuverdianu
78. Kannada
79. Kapampangan
80. Kashmiri
81. Kazakh
82. Khmer
83. Kinyarwanda
84. Klingon (Latin)
85. Klingon (pIqaD) (Note: Mobile app only)
86. Konkani
87. Korean
88. Krio
89. Kurdish (Central)
90. Kurdish (Northern)
91. Kyrgyz
92. Lao
93. Latin
94. Latvian
95. Ligurian (Genoese)
96. Limburgish
97. Lingala
98. Lithuanian
99. Lombard
100. Lower Sorbian
101. Luxembourgish
102. Macedonian
103. Maithili
104. Malagasy
105. Malay
106. Malayalam
107. Maltese
108. Manipuri
109. Marathi
110. Marwari
111. Mauritian Creole
112. Minangkabau (Latin)
113. Mongolian (Cyrillic)
114. Mongolian (Traditional)
115. Myanmar (Burmese)
116. Māori
117. Nepali
118. Norwegian
119. Norwegian Nynorsk
120. Nyanja
121. Occitan
122. Odia
123. Papiamento
124. Pashto
125. Persian
126. Polish
127. Portuguese (Brazil)
128. Portuguese (Portugal)
129. Punjabi
130. Punjabi (Shahmukhi)
131. Querétaro Otomi
132. Romanian
133. Rundi
134. Russian
135. Samoan
136. Sanskrit
137. Sardinian
138. Serbian (Cyrillic)
139. Serbian (Latin)
140. Sesotho
141. Sesotho sa Leboa
142. Setswana
143. Seychelles French Creole
144. Shona
145. Sicilian
146. Sindhi
147. Sinhala
148. Slovak
149. Slovenian
150. Somali
151. Spanish
152. Spanish (Mexico)
153. Sundanese
154. Swahili
155. Swedish
156. Tahitian
157. Tajik
158. Tamil
159. Tatar
160. Telugu
161. Tetum
162. Thai
163. Tibetan
164. Tigrinya
165. Tok Pisin
166. Tongan
167. Turkish
168. Turkmen
169. Ukrainian
170. Upper Sorbian
171. Urdu
172. Uyghur
173. Uzbek (Latin)
174. Venetian
175. Vietnamese
176. Waray
177. Welsh
178. Xhosa
179. Yiddish (Eastern)
180. Yoruba
181. Yucatec Maya
182. Zulu

=== Supported languages by text-to-speech ===
As of November 2026, Microsoft Translate supports 84 languages for the text-to-speech tool.

1. Afrikaans
2. Amharic
3. Arabic
4. Arabic (Egyptian)
5. Arabic (Moroccan)
6. Assamese
7. Asturian
8. Bangla
9. Belarusian
10. Bulgarian
11. Cantonese (Traditional)
12. Catalan
13. Chinese (Literary)
14. Chinese Simplified
15. Chinese Traditional
16. Croatian
17. Czech
18. Danish
19. Dutch
20. English
21. English (United Kingdom)
22. Estonian
23. Filipino
24. Finnish
25. French
26. French (Canada)
27. Galician
28. German
29. Greek
30. Gujarati
31. Hebrew
32. Hindi
33. Hungarian
34. Icelandic
35. Indonesian
36. Inuktitut
37. Inuktitut (Latin)
38. Irish
39. Italian
40. Japanese
41. Javanese
42. Kannada
43. Kazakh
44. Khmer
45. Korean
46. Lao
47. Latvian
48. Lithuanian
49. Macedonian
50. Malay
51. Malayalam
52. Maltese
53. Marathi
54. Myanmar (Burmese)
55. Norwegian
56. Pashto
57. Persian
58. Polish
59. Portuguese (Brazil)
60. Portuguese (Portugal)
61. Romanian
62. Russian
63. Serbian (Cyrillic)
64. Sesotho
65. Setswana
66. Sinhala
67. Slovak
68. Slovenian
69. Somali
70. Spanish
71. Spanish (Mexico)
72. Sundanese
73. Swahili
74. Swedish
75. Tamil
76. Telugu
77. Thai
78. Turkish
79. Ukrainian
80. Urdu
81. Uzbek (Latin)
82. Vietnamese
83. Welsh
84. Zulu

== Community partners ==
Microsoft Translator has engaged with community partners to increase the number of languages and to improve overall language translation quality. Below is a list of community partners that Microsoft Translator has teamed with.

- CNGL Centre for Global Intelligent Content
- Hmong Language Partners – Hmong Daw
- Jawaharlal Nehru University – Urdu
- Senedd Cymru (the Welsh Parliament, partnered as the National Assembly for Wales) – Welsh
- Tilde – Estonian, Latvian, Lithuanian
- Translators Without Borders – Swahili
- Appen – Filipino (Tagalog), Malagasy, Samoan, Tahitian, Tongan
- Government of Nunavut – Inuktitut
- Auckland University of Technology – Māori
- Waikato University – Māori
- Government of the State of Querétaro – Querétaro Otomi
- Klingon Language Institute – Klingon

Additionally, Microsoft has teamed with the Klingon Language Institute, which promotes the constructed language, Klingon, which is used within the fictional Star Trek universe produced by Paramount and CBS Studios. Klingon has been supported by Microsoft Translator since May 2013.

== See also ==
- Machine translation
- Speech synthesis
- Comparison of machine translation applications
- Microsoft text-to-speech voices
- Google Translate
- Yandex Translate
