= SCFG =

SCFG may refer to

- Stochastic context-free grammar, generative probability model that takes the shape of a context-free grammar
- Synchronous context-free grammar, in machine translation
