= Word alignment =

Word alignment may refer to:

- Word alignment (linguistics)
- Word alignment (computing)

== See also ==
- Word boundary (disambiguation)
