= EuroMatrixPlus =

The EuroMatrixPlus is a project that ran from March 2009 to February 2012. EuroMatrixPlus succeeded a project called EuroMatrix (September 2006 to February 2009) and continued in further development and improvement of machine translation (MT) systems for languages of the European Union (EU).

== Project objectives ==
EuroMatrixPlus focused on achieving several goals:

- To continue advance of MT technology (create MT systems for all official EU languages and provide other MT researchers with existing data and infrastructure).
- To continually expand and investigate different MT approaches and techniques; to stay open to novel combinations of methods of MT.
- To bring MT to the users. Users post-edit output of statistical models and the system learns from the feedback and improves itself. Two groups of users were aimed at:
  - Professional translators and translation agencies
  - Users who voluntarily translate texts into their native language
- To contribute to MT research in Europe.
- To produce sample application for automatic translation of news and web pages and make that application freely accessible.

== Outcome ==
EuroMatrixPlus contributed to MT field in several ways. It continued in development of an open source statistical MT engine Moses. The project worked on research in hybrid approaches to MT (combination of rule-based and statistical techniques). Several “MT Marathons” and annual evaluation campaigns were organized by the project. The project also resulted in releasing of 196 scientific publications.

The results of the work were arranged into ten work packages:

- WP1: Rich Tree-Based Statistical Translation
- WP2: Hybrid Machine Translation
- WP3: Advanced Learning Methods for MT
- WP4: Open Source Tools and Data
- WP5: "WikiTrans" Translation Environments
- WP6: Integrated Localisation Workflow
- WP7: Evaluation Campaign
- WP8: Project Management and Dissemination
- WP9: Integrating Slovak Language Resources
- WP10: HPSG-based Statistical Translation

=== Software and data ===
Here is a list of software and data that were released by the project:

- Appraise – an open source tool for manual evaluation of MT output
- BURGER – Bulgarian Resource
- BulTreeBank – Treebank of Bulgarian
- CSLM toolkit – free tool for training continuous space language models (CSLM) to large tasks
- Caitra – tool for post-editing MT results
- Europarl – European Parliament parallel corpus
- IRSTLM toolkit – tool for training language models
- Joshua – an open-source statistical machine translation decoder for hierarchical and syntax-based MT
- MT Server Land – an open-source architecture for MT
- Moses – statistical MT
- MultiUN Corpora – parallel corpus extracted from the United Nations Website
- PCEDT 2.0 – Prague Czech-English Dependency Treebank
- PEDT 2.0 – English part of the Prague Czech-English Dependency Treebank
- Slovak corpora – English-Slovak and Czech-Slovak as well as a Slovak-English and a Slovak-Czech parallel corpus
- Slovak treebank – A dependency treebank
- TermEx – RBMT-Suited Statistical Terminology Extraction Tool
- Treex, TectoMT

== Funding ==
The EuroMatrixPlus project was sponsored by EU Information Society Technology program.

Total cost of the project was 5 942 121 €, from which the European Union contributed 4 266 896 €.

== Project members ==
To ensure advance in MT, several organizations that are experts in various disciplines (linguistics, computer science, mathematics, translation) were brought together to cooperate on EuroMatrixPlus.

The consortium consisted of academic as well as commercial partners. Academic partners were the University of Edinburgh (United Kingdom), DFKI – German Research Centre for Artificial Intelligence (Germany), Charles University (Czech Republic), Johns Hopkins University (United States), University of Le Mans (France), Fondazione Bruno Kessler (Italy), Dublin City University (Ireland). Two institutions joined about one year into the project. These were the L'udovít Štúr Institute of Linguistics (Slovak Republic) and IICT – Institute of Information and Communication Technologies at the Bulgarian Academy of Sciences (Bulgaria).

Commercial partners included Lucy Software and Services GmbH (Germany) and CEET s.r.o. (Czech Republic).

Coordination of the project was in hands of DFKI with its Language Technology Lab in Saarbrücken. The principal investigator and scientific coordinator was Hans Uszkoreit, a professor of Computational Linguistics at Saarland University.
