= Word boundary =

Word boundary may refer to:

- Word boundary (linguistics)
- Word boundary (computing)

== See also ==
- Word alignment (disambiguation)
