= Frank Bergemann =

German handball coach (1956–2026)

Frank Bergemann (20 April 1956 – 7 November 2026) was a German handball coach.

== Career ==
Bergemann coached the clubs HG Erlangen and CSG Erlangen before moving to Austria in 2000 to join Alpla HC Hard. In 2003, he won the Austrian championship with Hard and was voted Coach of the Year. From 2007 until his dismissal in March 2015 he coached HC Erlangen, with whom he rose to the second Bundesliga in 2008 and to the first Bundesliga in 2014. In January 2016, he took over as coach of Bundesliga club HBW Balingen-Weilstetten for the rest of the season. After the season, Bergemann's contract was not renewed. Since February 2018 he has been coaching the Austrian club Handball Tirol.

His main occupation was sports teacher at the Albert-Schweitzer High School in Erlangen.

== Death ==
Bergemann died on 7 November 2026, at the age of 70.
