= Albert Schweitzer High School (Erlangen) =

High school in Bavaria, Germany

- Albert-Schweitzer-Gymnasium
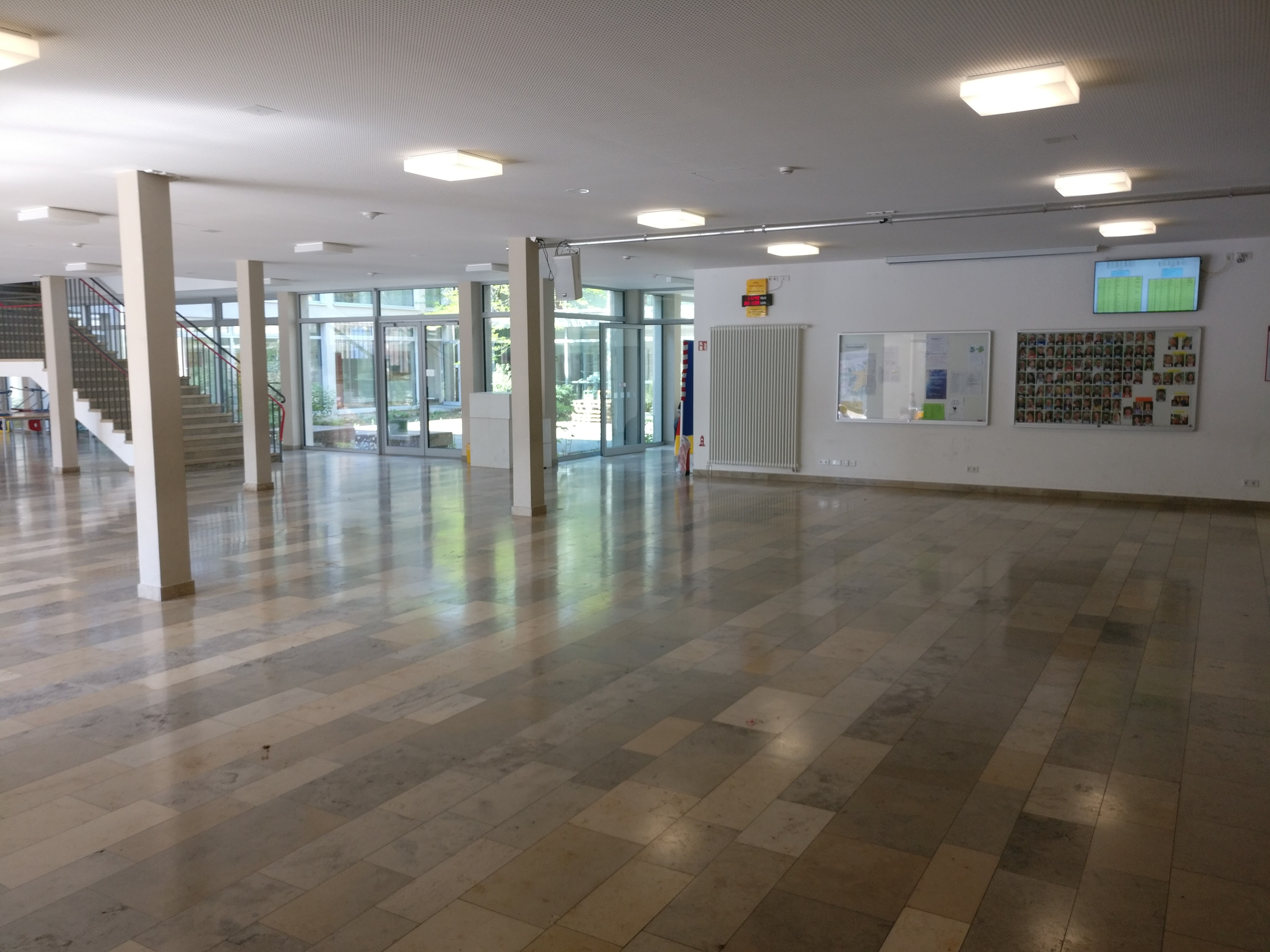
- Entrance hall of Albert Schweitzer High School Erlangen

Location
- Dompfaffstr. 111; Erlangen, Bavaria
- Coordinates: 49.6002°N 10.9767°E

Information
- Type: High school
- Principal: Katarina Keck
- Years offered: 1965-present
- Website: www.asg-er.de

Albert Schweitzer High School Erlangen (German: Albert-Schweitzer-Gymnasium Erlangen; commonly abbreviated ASG Erlangen) is a scientific-technical and linguistic secondary school in Erlangen, Germany.

== History ==
Named after doctor Albert Schweitzer, the school was founded in the 1960s as part of Ohm High School in Erlangen, as an increasing number of families moved from the city's core to the area west of the Regnitz. The Oberrealschule Erlangen-West was founded on 7 September 1965 to provide a local secondary school as well as to expand the capacity of the Ohm High School. The newly founded school was originally located in the building of the now neighboring Hermann Hedenus School and had a total of approximately 60 students in two fifth-grade classes.

The current name was given to the school as its founding date coincidentally matched the anniversary of death of Albert Schweitzer. The name was changed on 26 November 1965, after the school's parent council voted unanimously for the change and the school was given the last letter Albert Schweitzer had written before his death by university professor Heinrich Franke. The following years a proprietary building was built for the school and later expanded to offer enough classrooms for the steadily increasing number of students.

In the 1980s, four separate "mobile classrooms" were added in a one story building on the schoolyard. Another building, today used as an afternoon care and canteen, was built in 2005.

== Subjects ==
As important subjects, science, linguistic and math classes can be noted. Every student has to graduate in two foreign languages (English starting in grade five, Latin or French starting in grade 6). In grade 8, students can choose between a scientific and linguistic branch of the school. At the former, chemistry is introduced directly after the choosing, while at the later Spanish becomes a new subject as the third foreign language.

In grades 11 and 12, students can choose between two foreign languages or two natural sciences. Furthermore, there are "profile classes" which usually thematise a certain aspect of a main subject in depth. The school finishes with the Abitur.

== Characteristics ==
- The school is part of the youth initiative "Schule ohne Rassismus – Schule mit Courage".
- The high school is called a "Handball-base" and cooperates with HC Erlangen.

== Notable teachers ==
- Frank Bergemann (handball coach)

== Notable alumni ==
- Philipp Koehn, computer scientist
