= Animal Research Institute =

Research institute in Greece

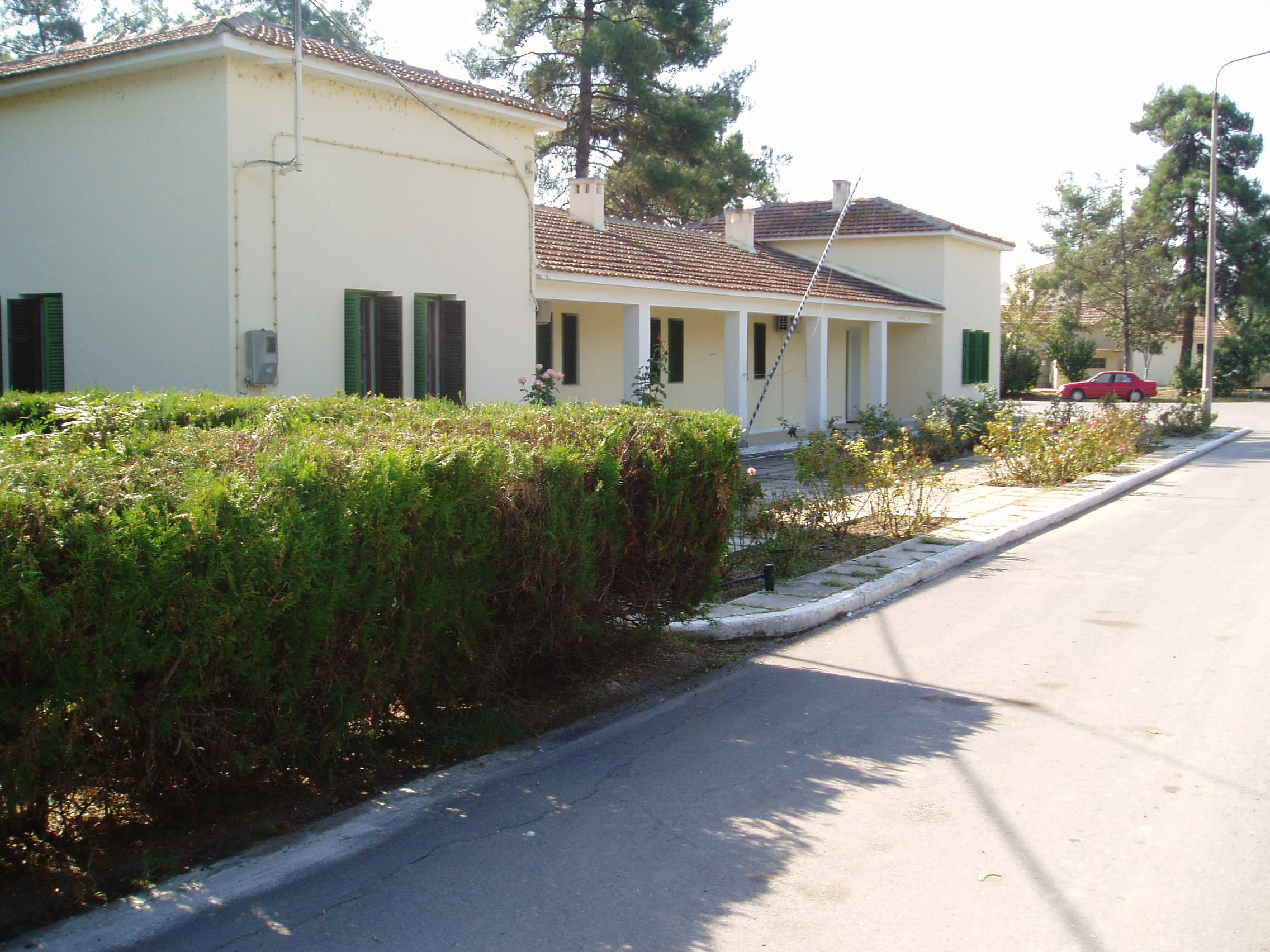
Animal Research Institute, Headquarters

Animal Research Institute is a research institute in Greece. It is part of the National Agricultural Research Foundation.

== History ==
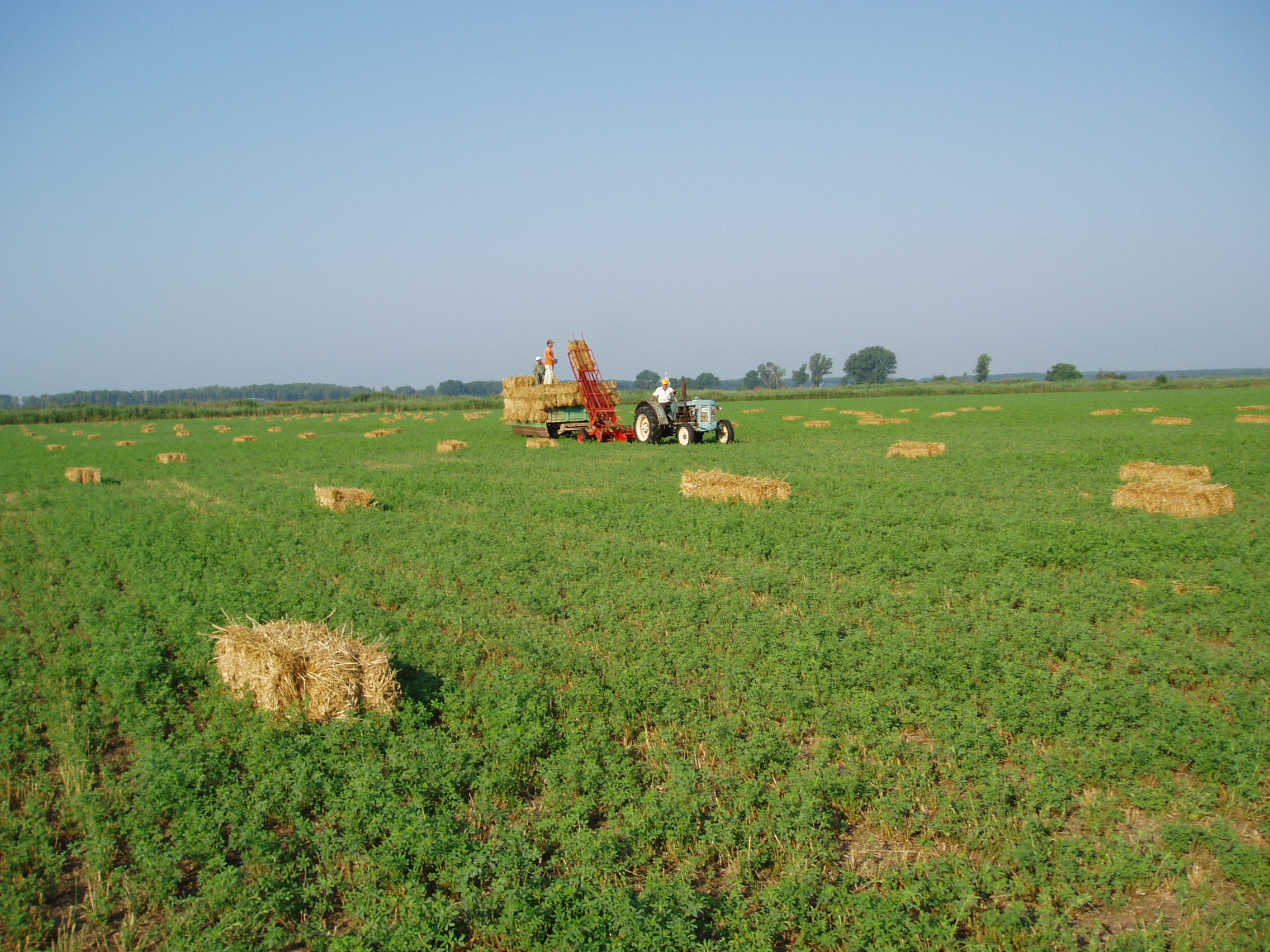
Alfalfa hay collection

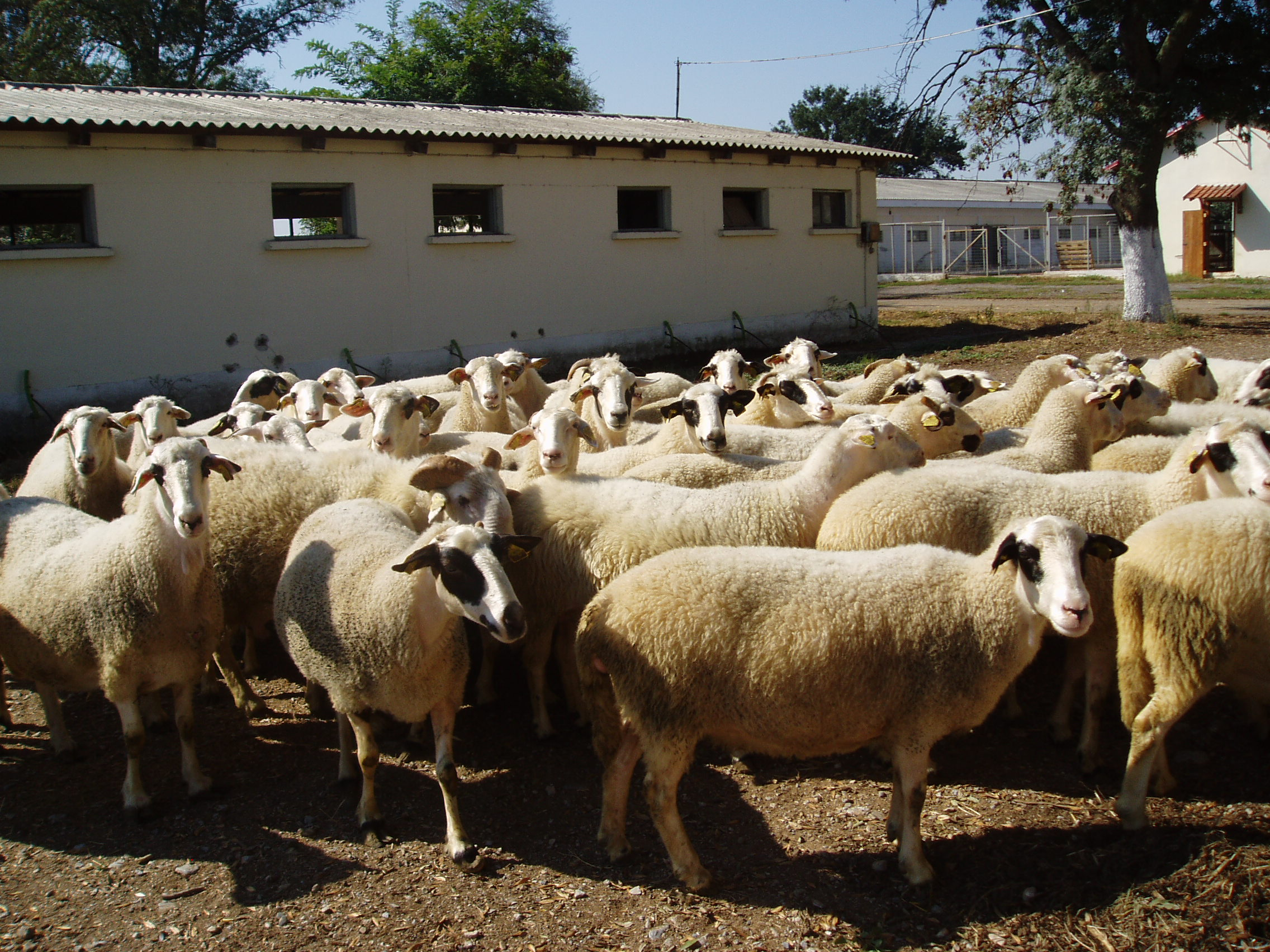
Florina (Pelagonia) sheep breed

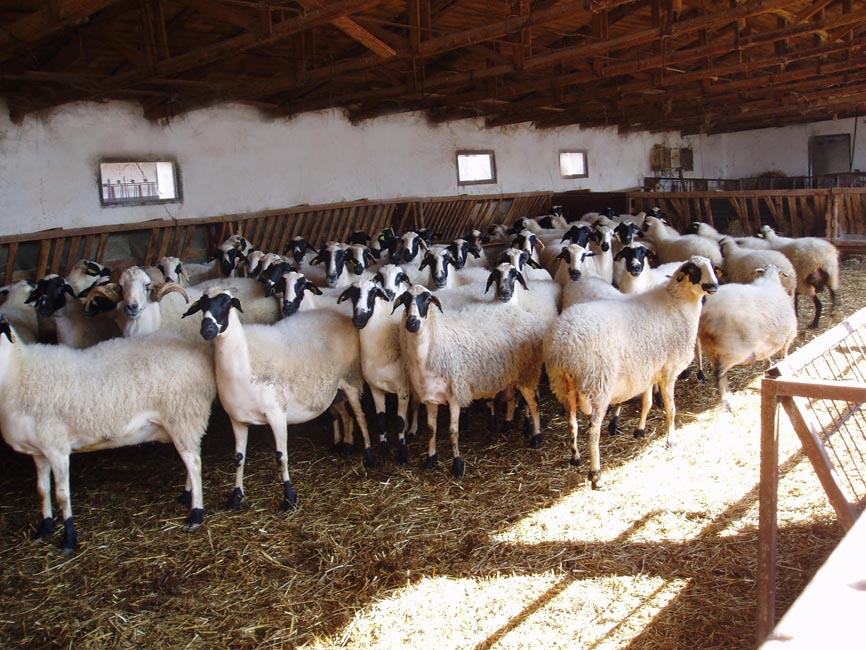
Chios sheep breed

The Animal Research Institute (ARI) was founded in 1952 as a unit of the Ministry of Agriculture and under the name "Animal Research Station". In 1961 it became the Institute of Animal Breeding and Nutrition and in 1977 it took its present name. ARI has been part of the National Agricultural Research Foundation (N.AG.RE.F.) since 1990 and it is located on 3.5 square kilometres of farmland in Paralimni-Giannitsa, Northern Greece.

== Objective ==
The ARI is an institute oriented toward research on general and special zootechnics and includes a specialized scientific staff. The ARI promotes research and technological activities aiming at an integrated approach to deal with rural problems within the framework of national agricultural policy and the agricultural policy of the European Union (EU). The ARI supports and coordinates initiatives for development suggested by the Ministry of Rural Development and Food, Greek Universities and Institutions, the agricultural cooperatives, product distributors, producers' groups etc.

== Activities ==
ARI's activities cover cross-sectional scientific disciplines related to the animal production with ARI being responsible for their development. ARI is engaged in the research on animal production, especially in the spheres of animal nutrition and physiology, feeding techniques, nutrition and growth, technological systems of farm animal husbandry, genetics and breeding of farm animals, physiology of reproduction (in collaboration with the Veterinary Research Institute of Thessaloniki), ethology of farm animals, improvement in the quality of animal products with respect to food safety and quality in human nutrition.

== Farm, facilities and animals ==
Purpose–oriented farming serves as a base for experimental activities. The ARI's area is 3.5 square kilometres (1.4 sq mi) of agricultural land, out of it 3.2 km^{2} (1.2 sq mi) of arable land with cropping plan focused on preferential provisions of experiments and 0.3 km^{2} (0.12 sq mi) with facilities for experiments with cattle, sheep, pigs and poultry. Today in ARI there are farmed cattle and sheep. The average number of animals is: 200 total cattle (out of it 70 dairy cows), 1000 total sheep (out of it 550 sheep of Chios breed and 450 sheep of Florina (Pelagonia) breed).

== See also ==
- List of universities in Greece
