= Institute for Language and Speech Processing =

Greek non-profit private foundation

Institute for Language and Speech Processing (ILSP)
- Ινστιτούτο Επεξεργασίας του Λόγου (in Greek)
- Established: 1991
- Field of research: Language technology
- Director: Vassilis Katsouros
- Location: Artemidos 6 & Epidavrou, Marousi, Athens, Greece; 38°2′12.12″N 23°48′9″E
- Website: http://www.ilsp.gr

The Institute for Language and Speech Processing (ILSP) (Greek: Ινστιτούτο Επεξεργασίας του Λόγου, ΙΕΛ) is an Athens based, Greek non-profit private foundation focusing on applied research in various areas mainly related to language technology. In 1991 ILSP was established as a research institute; it operates under the auspices of the General Secretariat for Research and Innovation, Ministry of Development and Investment. ILSP is the oldest institute of Athena Research & Innovation Center in Information, Communication and Science Technologies. The institute also has a division in Xanthi.

The goal of ILSP is to support the growth of Language Technology in Greece. To this end, it has brought together a team of experts creating the necessary technical infrastructure in accordance with the European Community policy towards safeguarding the European cultural heritage through technology. ILSP aims to be a pole of attraction for the language industry, which is growing both in Greece and in the rest of Europe, thus contributing to the expansion of activities in this particularly important area of current IT. The industrial direction which it maintains, the know-how of its researchers and the close relations it keeps with key research centres in other European countries, are the three basic elements of the institute's profile.

The main areas that form ILSP's research agenda are:

- Natural language processing
- Embodied language processing
- Speech and music technology
- Multimedia processing
- Multilingual content processing
- Sign language technologies
- Technology-enhanced language learning
- Language development and assessment
- Digital cultural archives

ILSP carries out applied research in man-machine interfaces, machine learning, speech processing, text processing, theoretical and computational linguistics, and language learning technologies. Expertise used by the Institute includes basic fields such as natural language processing, digital signal processing and pattern recognition. The institute's mission is mainly to support research by successfully combining the basic and applied perspectives and pursue complementary collaborations in the areas of interest, while maintaining a societal and industrial relevance.

ILSP has been creating the necessary technical infrastructure and a collaborative interdisciplinary framework enabling to:

- establish a comprehensive digitized repository of Modern Greek language data and resources to be used for a variety of purposes (research, education, preservation, evolution, dissemination, translation etc.)
- work on the interface between Modern Greek language and the other languages of the world
- develop highly innovative language and semiotic technologies.

== See also ==
- List of research institutes in Greece
