= Skype Translator =

Speech to speech translation application by Skype

Skype Translator is a speech to speech translation application developed by Skype, which has operated as a division of Microsoft since 2018. Skype Translator Preview has been publicly available since December 15, 2015. Skype Translator is available as a standalone app and, as of October 2015, is integrated into the Skype for Windows desktop app.

Skype Translator was built on developments in deep neural networks for speech recognition and Microsoft Translator's statistical machine translation technology. Users converse in their native languages, and the speech is translated from one language to the other in “near real-time”, with the output translation presented by computer-generated speech synthesis. The current version supports speech translation to and from English, French, German, Chinese (Mandarin), Italian, Spanish, Portuguese, Arabic, Japanese and Russian.

The application also features on-screen text transcripts of the spoken phrases in their original language along with the translation. In addition, Skype Translator supports Skype Instant Message, which can translate users’ instant messages into more than 70 languages supported by Microsoft Translator.

In October 2015, Skype announced that Skype Translator has been integrated into Skype for Windows desktop. This functionality is available to users following automatic updates to their Skype desktop app.

In March 2016, Microsoft Translator announced that the Microsoft Translator API that powers Skype Translator is available as service for businesses that want to add speech translation to their custom apps and solutions.

== See also ==
- Machine translation
- Microsoft Translator
- Language
