= Centre for Technological Research of Crete =

Greek research institute

Coordinates: 35.318°N 25.102°E

The Centre for Technological Research of Crete (CTR-Crete) (Greek: Κέντρο Τεχνολογικής Έρευνας (ΚΤΕ) Κρήτης) in Heraklion was founded according to the presidential decree No. 143/Φ.Ε.Κ. 123/20-6-2001 and is under the supervision and financing of the Ministry of National Education and Religious Affairs (Greece). It is a Private Legal Body, self-governed within the framework of articles 11 and 12 par. 1 of 1771/1998 Greek law and its internal regulation. There are 55 staff member, including 25 research scientists, 15 assistant researchers, and 15 associate researchers. CTR-Crete is affiliated with the Technological Educational Institute (TEI) of Crete and includes eight Sectors of Technology Transfer and Research operating in all four regional units of Crete.

== Sectors of CTR-Crete ==
- Rural Technology and Development in Heraklion
- Operational Research and Strategical Development in Heraklion
- Natural and Built Environment in Heraklion
- Social Care and Management of Natural and Intended Disasters in Heraklion
- Systems Design and Development and Constructions in Heraklion
- Natural Resources and Natural Disasters in Chania
- Applied Acoustics and Natural Prototyping of Music Instruments and Space in Rethymno
- Health Nutrition and Dietology in Lasithi

== CTR's main targets ==
CTR is active in:

- The development of technological research;
- The implementation of scientific and technological achievements for solving specific problems of the production process and of the social and economic growth of the district of Crete;
- The improvement of methodology and production processes serving needs of the districts of Crete and of the entire country in general;
- The development of novel applications and products;
- Rendering of unique services, as well as
- The support of handicraft and industrial units.
- Maintaining an interactive relationship with the productive units and the organised unions of the local economy.
- Collaborating with the Technological Educational Institute of Crete and promoting the development of the relations with other institutes, research centres, universities, and other organisations of the public and private sectors.
- Elaborating studies and carrying out specific technological projects either funded by EU or ordered by third parties or in collaboration with third parties.
- Supervising the organisation and the financing of the research of technological programmes in Greece and abroad, publications, seminars and conventions.
- Producing technological products and providing novel services in accordance with its research-technological interests.
- Promoting the advanced technology transfer and disseminating of know-how.

== CTR-Crete's laboratories and areas of research ==
- The Research and Development of Telecommunication Systems Laboratory "PASIPHAE"

The Pasiphae Lab is part of the Centre for Technological Research of Crete PASIPHAE Lab research areas include:

- Computer networks
- Broadband communications (DVB-T, DVB-S, DVB-S2, DVB-H)
- Network management (QoS, DiffServ, IntServ, MPLS)
- Multimedia communications
- Network security issues
- Cellular and wireless networks (WPANs, WLANs, WMANs, WIMAX)
- Heterogeneous radio technologies and reconfigurable networks
- Wireless multimedia communications
- Traffic modeling and performance evaluation
- Ad hoc, mesh networking
- Mobile and ubiquitous computing
- Mobile and wireless networks security

Pasiphae Lab official website
