= Povo =

- Frazione
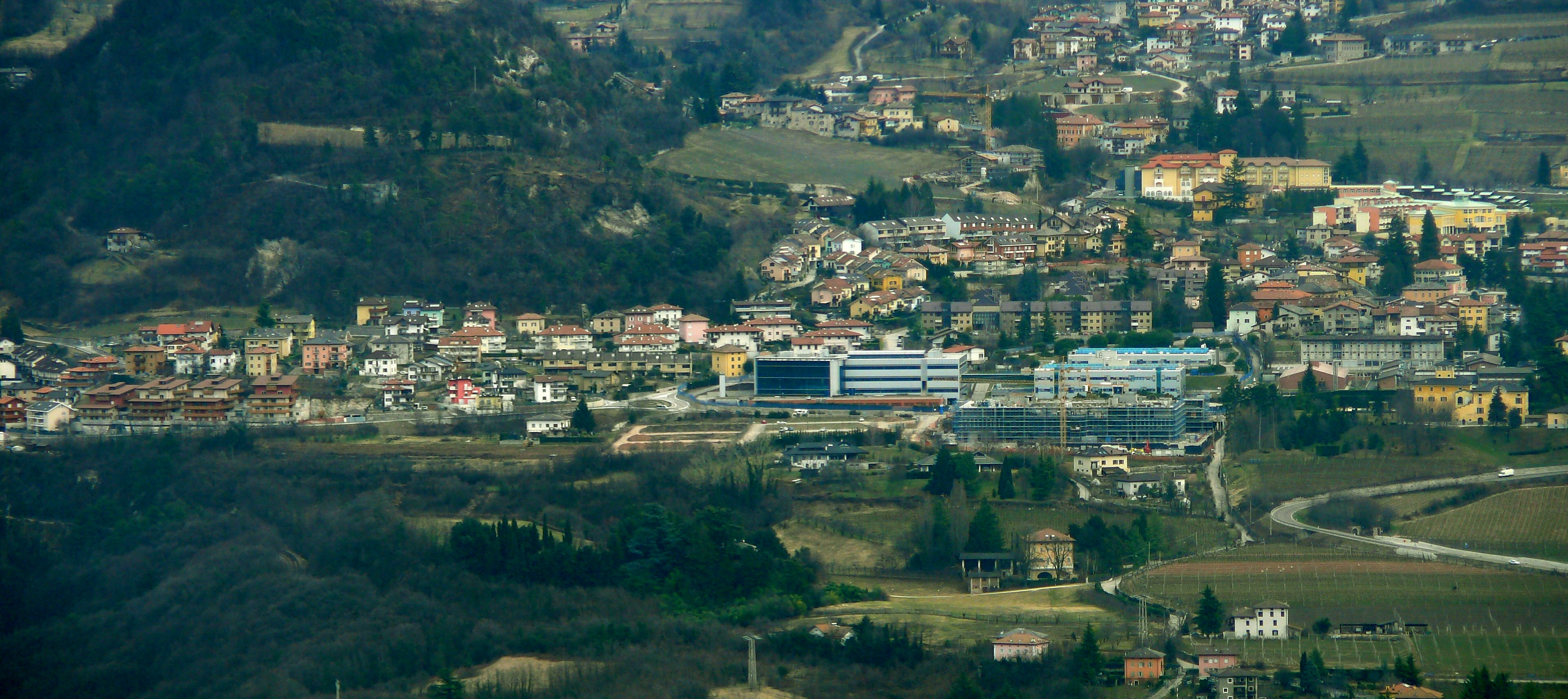
- Center of Povo, University and FBK in foreground

- Location of Povo in Italy
- Coordinates: 46°3′58″N 11°9′16″E
- Country: Italy
- Region: Trentino-Alto Adige/Südtirol
- Province: Trentino
- Comune: Trento

Area
  - Total: 15.47 km^{2} (5.97 sq mi)
- Elevation: 398 m (1,306 ft)

Population (31.12.2009)
  - Total: 5,571
  - Density: 360.1/km^{2} (932.7/sq mi)
- Demonym: poèri
- Time zone: UTC+1 (CET)
  - Summer (DST): UTC+2 (CEST)
- Postal code: 38123
- Dialing code: 0461
- Patron saint: St. Paul and St. Andrew
- Saint day: Trento: 26 June (Vigilius of Trent)

Povo is a suburb of Trento, in Trentino, northern Italy.

== Geography ==
Povo is about three kilometers away from the city on the east side of the valley at the foot of mountains Marzola and Celva. Povo is crossed by rio Salè, a tributary of Fersina stream. Povo is divided into 9 fractions: Salè, Sprè, Pantè, Graffiano, Oltrecastello, Celva, Borino, Cimirlo mountain pass and Gabbiolo.

== Education ==
Povo is home to the scientific and engineering schools of the University of Trento and to several research centres.

The following departments, formerly members of the (discontinued) Faculty of Mathematical, Physical and Natural Sciences and Faculty of Engineering of the University of Trento, are based in Povo:

- The Department of Civil, Environmental and Mechanical Engineering (DICAM), located in the Mesiano area
- The Department of Mathematics and the Department of Physics, located in the "old faculty", a set of buildings informally called "Povo 0"
- The Department of Information Science and Engineering (DISI), located in the Polo Scientifico e Tecnologico "Fabio Ferrari", two recent buildings connected by a suspended bridge, informally called "Povo 1" and "Povo 2".
- The Department of Industrial Engineering (DII), located in the Polo Scientifico e Tecnologico "Fabio Ferrari" (Povo 2).
- The Department of Cellular, Computational and Integrative Biology (dCIBIO), located in the Polo Scientifico e Tecnologico "Fabio Ferrari" (Povo 2).

Other scientific institutions in the frazione include:

- The Fondazione Bruno Kessler (FBK), formerly known as IRST, located close to both the old and new buildings of the University
- CREATE-NET, an international research center.
- GraphiTech Foundation - Centre for Advanced Computer Graphics Technologies.

== Twin towns ==
- Znojmo, Czech Republic, since 1996
