= Synchronous context-free grammar =

Synchronous context-free grammars (SynCFG or SCFG; not to be confused with stochastic CFGs) are a type of formal grammar designed for use in transfer-based machine translation. Rules in these grammars apply to two languages at the same time, capturing grammatical structures that are each other's translations.

The theory of SynCFGs borrows from syntax-directed transduction and syntax-based machine translation, modeling the reordering of clauses that occurs when translating a sentence by correspondences between phrase-structure rules in the source and target languages. Performance of SCFG-based MT systems has been found comparable with, or even better than, state-of-the-art phrase-based machine translation systems. Several algorithms exist to perform translation using SynCFGs.

== Formalism ==
Rules in a SynCFG are superficially similar to CFG rules, except that they specify the structure of two phrases at the same time; one in the source language (the language being translated) and one in the target language. Numeric indices indicate correspondences between non-terminals in both constituent trees. Chiang gives the Chinese/English example:

X → (yu X_{1} you X_{2}, have X_{2} with X_{1})

This rule indicates that an X phrase can be formed in Chinese with the structure "yu X_{1} you X_{2}", where X_{1} and X_{2} are variables standing in for subphrases; and that the corresponding structure in English is "have X_{2} with X_{1}" where X_{1} and X_{2} are independently translated to English.

== Software ==
- cdec, MT decoding package that supports SynCFGs
- Joshua, a machine translation decoding system written in Java
