= Hans Uszkoreit =

German computational linguist

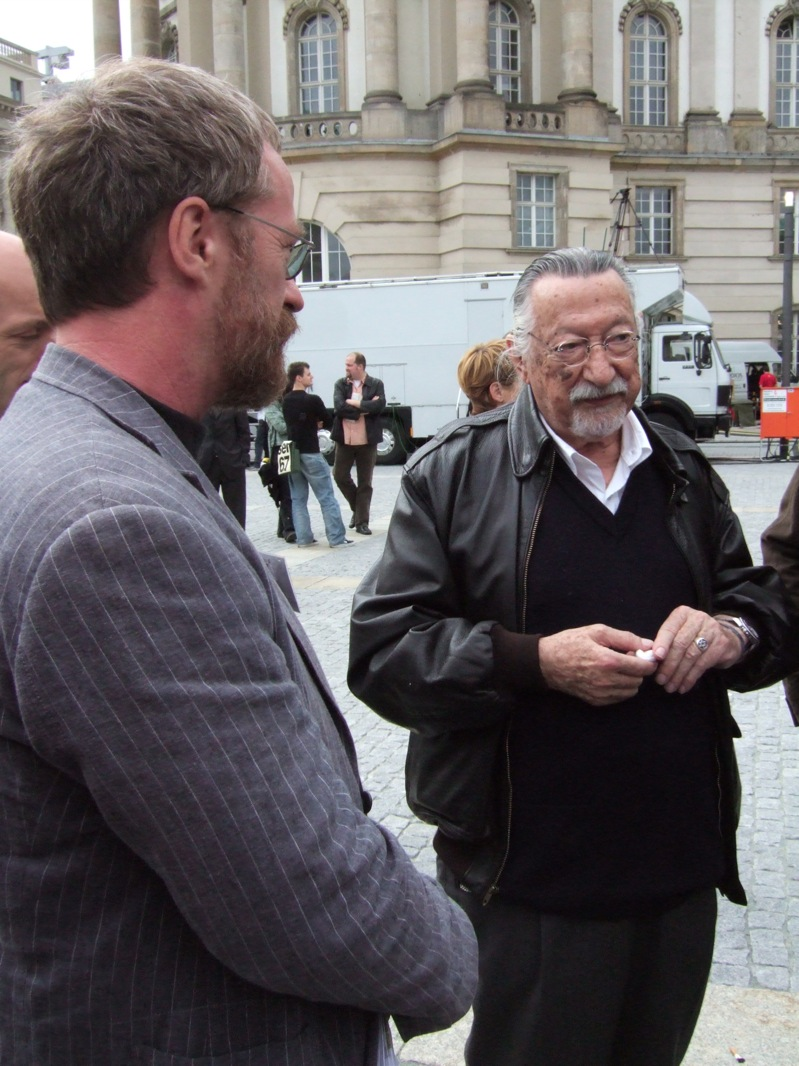
- Hans Uszkoreit (left) and Joseph Weizenbaum (right) in 2006
- Born: 1950 (age 75–76); Rostock, East Germany
- Education: Technische Universität Berlin, University of Texas at Austin
- Known for: Natural Language Processing
- Scientific career
- Fields: Linguistics, Computational Linguistics
- Workplaces: Saarland University, German Research Center for Artificial Intelligence

Hans Uszkoreit is a German computational linguist.

Hans Uszkoreit studied Linguistics and Computer Science at Technische Universität Berlin and the University of Texas at Austin. While he was studying in Austin, he also worked as a research associate in a large machine translation project at the Linguistics Research Center. After he received his Ph.D. in linguistics from the University of Texas, he worked as a computer scientist at the Artificial Intelligence Center and was affiliated with the Center for the Study of Language and Information at Stanford University.

Nowadays, he is teaching as a professor of Computational Linguistics at Saarland University. Moreover, he serves as a Scientific Director at the German Research Center for Artificial Intelligence (DFKI) where he heads the DFKI Language Technology Lab.

== Life and career ==
Hans Uszkoreit, a native of East Berlin, was actively involved in a group of young individuals who opposed the East Germany regime. His protesting against the 1968 invasion of Czechoslovakia led to his expulsion from high school and subsequent imprisonment for a period of fifteen months on charges of subversive agitation. Realizing that continuing his education in East Germany was not feasible, Uszkoreit made the decision to escape to West Berlin. There, he completed his high school education and pursued a degree in Linguistics and Computer Science at Technische Universität Berlin. During his time as a student, he worked part-time as an editor and writer for Zitty, a city magazine, which he co-founded.

In 1977, Uszkoreit was granted a Fulbright Grant to further his studies at the University of Texas at Austin. During his time in Austin, he concurrently served as a research associate in a significant machine translation project. Subsequently, he received a second Fulbright grant, which enabled him to pursue a Ph.D. program in linguistics. In 1984, he successfully completed his doctoral studies, earning a Ph.D. in linguistics.

Between 1982 and 1986, Uszkoreit held the position of a computer scientist at the Artificial Intelligence Center of SRI International in Menlo Park, California. In 1988, he created the Department of Computational Linguistics and Phonetics at Saarland University. In 1989 he was elected head of the Language Technology Lab at DFKI.

In 2012, Uszkoreit's achievements in the domain of relation extraction led to his receipt of a Google Faculty Research Award, acknowledging the substantial progress made by Uszkoreit and his team in advancing the field. In 2013, Uszkoreit, in collaboration with Feiyu Xu and Roberto Navigli, was granted an additional Google Research Award, which provided support for a targeted project within Google's Language Understanding Program, focusing on the augmentation of language comprehension and analysis.

== Personal life ==
His son, Jakob Uszkoreit, is a machine learning researcher, one of the authors of the landmark paper "Attention Is All You Need". He also have a daughter, Lena Uszkoreit.

== Awards ==
- 2002 Elected Member of the European Academy of Sciences
- 2012 Google Faculty Research Award
- 2013 Google Focused Research Award
