= Fondazione Bruno Kessler =

Research institute in Trento, Italy

Coordinates: 46°04′04.5″N 11°09′04.5″E

Fondazione Bruno Kessler (FBK) is a research institution in the Autonomous Province of Trento specializing in the fields of technology, innovation, the humanities and social sciences.
