= Moses (machine translation) =

- Developer: University of Edinburgh
- Stable release: 4.0 / October 5, 2017; 9 years ago
- Written in: C++, Perl
- Operating system: Windows, Linux, macOS
- Type: Machine translation
- License: LGPL
- Website: statmt.org/moses
- Repository: github.com/moses-smt/mosesdecoder

Moses is a statistical machine translation engine that can be used to train statistical models of text translation from a source language to a target language, developed by the University of Edinburgh. Moses then allows new source-language text to be decoded using these models to produce automatic translations in the target language. Training requires a parallel corpus of passages in the two languages, typically manually translated sentence pairs. Moses is free and open-source software, released under the GNU Library Public License (LGPL), and available as source code and binary files for Windows and Linux. Its development is supported mainly by the EuroMatrix project, with funding by the European Commission.

Among its features are:

- A beam search algorithm that quickly finds the highest probability translation within a set of choices
- Phrase-based translation of short text chunks
- Handles words with multiple factored representations to enable integrating linguistic and other information (e.g., surface form, lemma and morphology, part-of-speech, word class)
- Decodes ambiguous forms of a source sentence, represented as a confusion network, to support integrating with upstream tools such as speech recognizers
- Support for large language models (LMs) such as IRSTLM (an exact LM using memory-mapping) and RandLM (an inexact LM based on Bloom filters)

== See also ==
- Apertium
- OpenLogos
- Comparison of machine translation applications
- Machine translation
