= Gale–Church alignment algorithm =

Parallel text alignment algorithm

In computational linguistics and natural language processing, the Gale–Church algorithm is a method for aligning corresponding sentences in a parallel corpus. It works on the principle that equivalent sentences should roughly correspond in length; that is, longer sentences in one language should correspond to longer sentences in the other language. The algorithm was described in a 1993 paper by William A. Gale and Kenneth W. Church of AT&T Bell Laboratories.
