= Tencent Cloud =

Cloud computing platform provided by Tencent

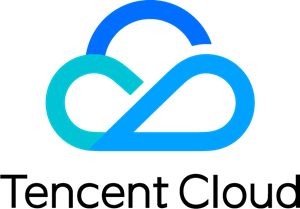
- Type: Subsidiary
- Industry: Cloud Computing
- Founded: September 2013; 13 years ago
- Headquarters: Shenzhen, China
- Key people: Dowson Tong (CEO)
- Parent: Tencent
- Website: cloud.tencent.com（Mainland China） www.tencentcloud.com（Worldwide）

Tencent Cloud (simplified Chinese: 腾讯云; traditional Chinese: 騰訊雲) is a cloud computing service operated by Tencent, a multinational technology company headquartered in China. It provides cloud services to domestic and international clients and operates data centers globally.

Founded in 2013, Tencent Cloud provides on-demand cloud computing products and services to the public and private sectors. The company maintains a network of over 11,000 partners globally, spanning industries such as telecommunications, finance, and healthcare, to support regional service delivery.

As of Q4 2024, Tencent Cloud held approximately 2% of the global cloud infrastructure service market by revenue, ranking 8th globally, according to Synergy Research Group. In China, it was the third-largest cloud service provider with a 15% market share in Q3 2024, according to Canalys.

Tencent Cloud operates 66 availability zones across 23 regions globally, and is supported by more than 3,200 content delivery nodes (CDNs). It has nine technical support centers across Indonesia, the Philippines, Malaysia, Singapore, Thailand, Japan, South Korea, the USA, and Germany.

== History ==
Tencent Cloud was launched in September 2013 as Tencent's cloud computing division.

=== Global expansion ===
Beginning in 2016, Tencent Cloud expanded its global footprint by establishing partnerships in Asia, Europe, and the Americas. In 2018, it created Tencent Cloud and Smart Industries Group (CSIG).

In 2020, Tencent Cloud partnered with Huawei to develop GameMatrix, a cloud-based gaming platform.

In 2021, Tencent Cloud opened new data centers in Bangkok, Frankfurt, Hong Kong, Jakarta, Tokyo, and Sao Paulo. By then, it operated data centers in 27 geographic areas across five continents with 66 availability zones.

Tencent Cloud was ranked the second-largest cloud service provider in China by IDC in the same year, based on market share and year-on-year growth.

In 2024, the company expanded to emerging markets through software deployments in Africa, the Middle East and Southeast Asia. The Orange Group integrated Tencent Cloud’s mini program framework into its "Max It" application, while Indonesian digital infrastructure company MCASH and Singapore-based mobility platform Ryde also adopted Tencent Cloud technologies.

In June 2025, Tencent announced that it is looking to boost its cloud computing business in Europe by relying on expertise in areas from gaming to video streaming that it has built up in China. This expansion will pitch the firm against U.S. hyperscalers like Amazon, Microsoft and Google.

=== Recent developments ===
From 2022 onward, Tencent Cloud entered into several regional and technological partnerships, including the Indonesian game streaming service GOX and various Web3 entities such as Ankr, Avalanche, Scroll, and Sui, and Chainlink Labs. In 2024, it became the cloud server provider for Pocketpair's multiplayer game Palworld and launched Alto Cloud, a data center in Cyberjaya, Malaysia, with Global Resources Management Sdn. Bhd. (GRM).

In 2025, Tencent Cloud announced plans for a new cloud region in Saudi Arabia with two availability zones, set to begin operations within the year.

In 2026, the company announced the launch of a new availability zone in Frankfurt, Germany, which will become its third availability zone in the country and is scheduled to begin operations by Q2 of 2026.

In 2026, Tencent Cloud expanded the global availability of HY 3D (formerly Hunyuan 3D), an AI platform for generating 3D assets, and announced partnerships with several European firms including 3D AI studio, CGTrader, and Maxon.

== Data centers ==
- Mainland China: Guangzhou, Shenzhen, Shanghai, Nanjing, Beijing, Chengdu, Chongqing, Qingyuan
- Worldwide: Hong Kong, Singapore, Seoul, Tokyo, Bangkok, Silicon Valley, Virginia, Frankfurt, São Paulo, Jakarta

== Services ==
Tencent Cloud provides over 700 cloud-based services across areas such as compute, storage, networking and databases.

Other solutions include digital avatar technology, cloud media services, and real-time communication capabilities. Tencent Cloud also offers electronic Know Your Customer (eKYC) capabilities, used by customers such as Indonesian telecommunications company Telkomsel, who also uses the company’s palm verification technology.

Tencent Cloud offers PalmAI, a palm-based biometric authentication service that uses infrared imaging to analyze palm vein and palm print patterns for contactless identity verification. The technology has been used in payment, healthcare, and access-control applications, including WeChat palm payment services in China and overseas partnerships in markets such as Hong Kong and Brazil.

Media Services is a suite of audio and video technology solutions for businesses by Tencent Cloud. The suite includes Platform-as-a-Service (PaaS) offerings for cloud streaming, video-on-demand, real-time communication, chat, and media processing. The services are applied in sectors such as online education, virtual events, and digital recruitment platforms, including integration in job-matching applications such as KUPU in Indonesia.

Tencent Cloud’s AI Digital Human technology allows for the creation of AI-generated digital avatars for various enterprise applications. It integrates computer vision, natural language processing, and speech synthesis to support interactive media and customer service use cases. The technology has been applied in areas such as media production, live streaming, tourism, and customer engagement.

Tencent Cloud also offers an agent development platform, which allows for the development and deployment of autonomous AI agents. It integrates technologies such as large language models (LLMs), retrieval-augmented generation (RAG), and multi-agent systems to support the creation of task-oriented digital agents for enterprise applications. It is supported by Agent Runtime, an AI infrastructure layer that enables the management and operation of these agents in production environments.

Tencent Cloud’s Artificial Intelligence of Things (AIoT) is a suite of tools for intelligent device development which provides device management, messaging, and real-time communication capabilities. The platform has been used in applications such as smart toys, wearables, robotics, and security devices. It includes TWeTalk, a voice intelligence system featuring speech-to-text and emotion recognition, and TWeSee, a visual intelligence system supporting video summarization, object detection, and multimodal search.

Tencent Cloud’s Super App as a Service (TCSAS) is a platform offering container-based mini program functionality, development tools, performance monitoring, operational security tools, and integrated payment and service functions. In 2025, Tencent Cloud partnered with e& UAE’s Smiles SuperApp to integrate as mini apps within the platform. They also announced collaborations with UAE-based Tawasal Information Technology and Klickl to enhance app integration, gaming features, and Web3 financial infrastructure.

=== Technical issues ===
On April 8, 2024, Tencent Cloud experienced disruptions due to irregularities with its cloud programming interface, reportedly affecting at least 1,957 clients.
