= Eckhard Bick =

German Esperantist

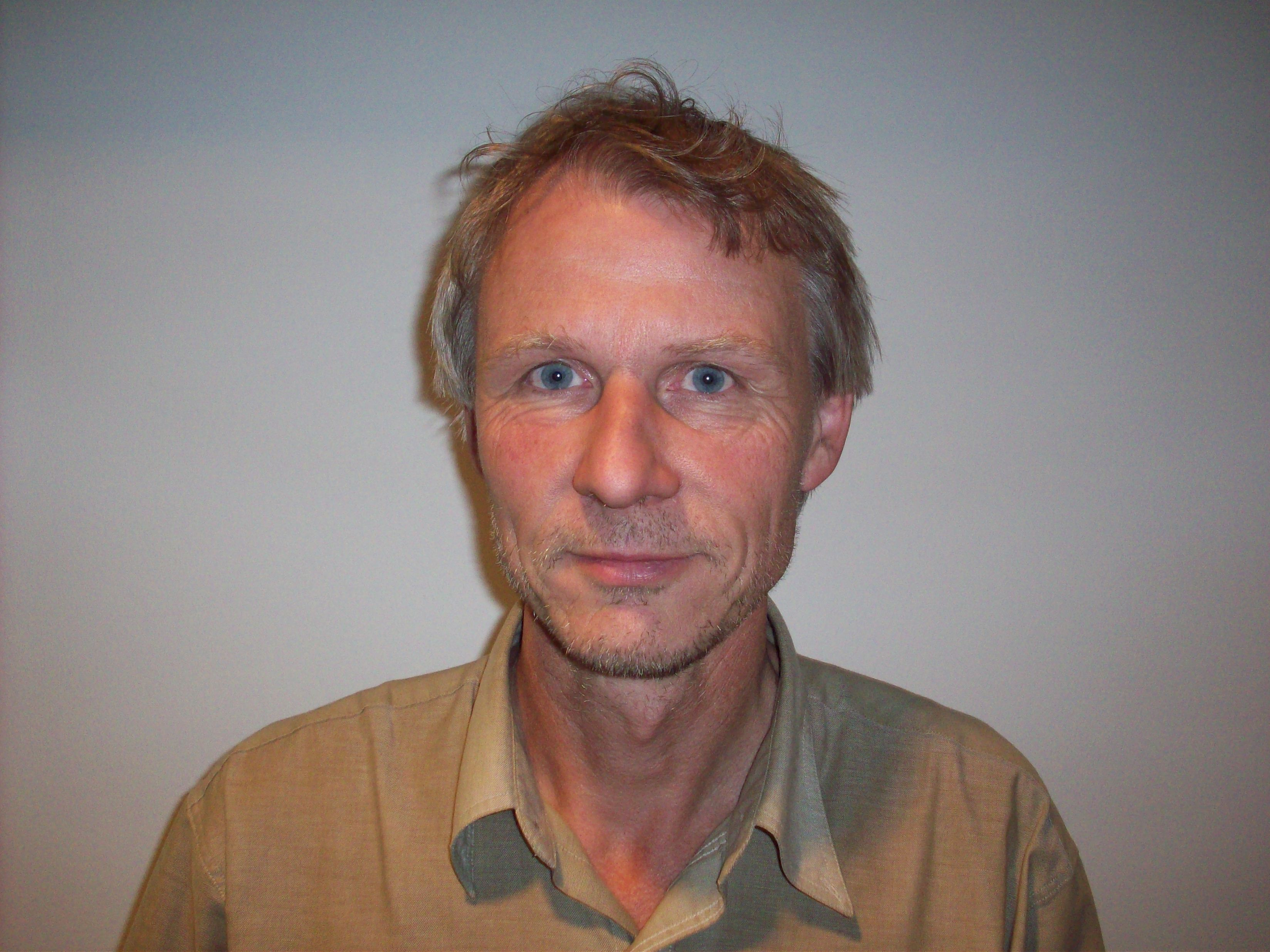
Eckhard Bick, July 2008

Eckhard Bick (born 16 July 1958) is a German-born Esperantist who studied medicine in Bonn but now works as a researcher in computational linguistics. He was active in an Esperanto youth group in Bonn and in the Germana Esperanto-Junularo, a nationwide Esperanto youth federation. Since his marriage to a Danish woman he and his family live in Denmark.

== Education ==
Bick obtained degrees in English (1983), Medicine (1984) and Pedagogics (1985) from Bonn University and an M.A. in North Germanic languages and Portuguese from the Institute for Linguistics at Aarhus University (1994-99). Bick's dissertation project in lexicography described "Palavras", a so-called progressive level parser and a dependency grammar for the Portuguese language, both based on a constraint grammar paradigm and supported by corpus-based research. The thesis analyzes Portuguese lexical morphology, morphosyntax, syntax, semantics and semantic parsing, as well as computer-mediated learning and translation.

== Esperanto activities ==
With book illustrator Uta Hasekamp, he is co-author of Tesi, la testudo, a German-language Esperanto primer. He has translated books, songs and plays into Esperanto, and has published various Esperanto games. He is also author of an extensive Esperanto-Danish dictionary with about 35,000 headwords (1990, 342 pp.). With an extent comparable to the classic Store Esperanto-Dansk Ordbog ("Great Esperanto-Danish Dictionary") by Lorenz Friis and Peter Frey (three editions published in 1938, 1953 and 1969, with about 31,000 headwords), Bick's dictionary is more up-to-date and is today the leading dictionary of its type.

== Linguistics career ==
Since 1996 Bick has led the Visual Interactive Syntax Learning project at the Institute for Language and Communication at the University of Southern Denmark, where he is engaged in the design and programming of grammatical tools for the Internet. He also builds constraint grammars and phrase structure grammars for the VISL languages, lexical resources and annotated corpora. Known as Treebanks, these corpora include a grammatical analysis for each word; his VISL team has generated such manually revised language data for 27 languages and, in cooperation with GrammarSoft, which is commercializing the technology, developed rule-based taggers and parsers for nine languages, including English, Portuguese, Esperanto and the Scandinavian languages.

As a linguist, Bick researches natural language parsing and corpus linguistics. Though he specializes in Portuguese and Danish, he has also developed constraint grammars for English, Spanish, French and Esperanto.

== Works ==
- Tesi, la testudo: Esperanto-Lehrbuch/intensa lernolibro ("Tessie the Turtle"), 1st ed. 1985, revised 3rd ed. 2006, 226 pp., ISBN 978-3-922570-80-6.
- Esperanto-dansk ordbog ("Esperanto-Danish Dictionary"), 2nd ed., 1997, Mnemo, 258 pp., ISBN 87-89621-05-0.
- The parsing system Palavras, 1999, Aarhus Univ. Press, 411 pp., ISBN 87-7288-910-1.
- Øreakupunktur ("Ear Acupuncture"), 2000, Mnemo, 175 pp., ISBN 87-89621-08-5.
- Kinesisk urtemedicin: Teori og praksis ("Chinese Herbal Medicine: Theory and Practice"), 2001, Mnemo, 672 pp., ISBN 87-89621-09-3.
- Klassisk akupunktur ("Classic Acupuncture"), 2nd ed., 2002, Mnemo, 848 pp., ISBN 87-89621-11-5.
- Grammy i Klostermølleskoven: Tværsproglig sætningsanalyse for begyndere ("Grammy in the Klostermølle Forest: Cross-Linguistic Sentence Analysis for Beginners"), 2002, Mnemo, 64 pp., ISBN 87-89621-12-3.
- Portugisisk-dansk ordbog ("Portuguese-Danish Dictionary"), 4th ed., 2003, Mnemo, 520 pp., ISBN 87-89621-13-1.
