= Tom Galligan =

Tom Galligan may refer to:

- Tom Galligan (cinematographer) (1891–1965), American cinematographer
- Tom Galligan (college president) (born 1955), president of Louisiana State University
- Tom Galligan (mayor) (born 1946), mayor of Jeffersonville, Indiana
