= Vissing (name) =

Vissing is a surname and middle name. People associated with the name include:

- Annette Vissing-Jørgensen
- Richard Vissing
- Claus Vissing

== See also ==
- Vissing
