= Tom Galligan (mayor) =

Mayor of Jeffersonville
- In office January 1, 1996 – December 31, 2003
- Preceded by: Raymond Parker, Jr.
- Succeeded by: Rob Waiz
- In office January 1, 2008 – December 31, 2011
- Preceded by: Rob Waiz
- Succeeded by: Mike Moore

Member of the Clark County Board of Aviation Commissioners
- Incumbent
- Assumed office November 20, 2012
- Preceded by: Mike Vissing

Personal details
- Born: August 6, 1946 (age 80)
- Party: Democratic
- Education: Bellarmine College
- Occupation: Mayor

Thomas R. Galligan (born August 6, 1946) is a former three-term mayor of Jeffersonville, Indiana, United States, serving from 1996 to 2003 and again from 2008 to 2011. Galligan succeeded incumbent Raymond Parker Jr. in the 1995 mayoral election and was unseated by challenger, Rob Waiz, during the 2003 election. Galligan defeated Waiz during the 2007 election and was defeated by Clark County Commissioner, Mike Moore, during the 2011 election.

== Biography ==
Galligan graduated from Providence High School's class of 1964 in Clarksville, Indiana and then went to Bellarmine College in Louisville, Kentucky for two years before leaving in 1966 and then attended economic development training conferences.

Galligan has lived in Jeffersonville for all his life. He is divorced with four children and six grandchildren. Galligan is a Member of the Knights of Columbus and attends St. Augustine's Church.

=== Career highlights ===
Throughout his career, Galligan has been a business owner and politician. He served as the mayor of Jeffersonville for two terms. He has also served as the chairman for KIDPA. He was a member of the Transportation Policy Commission for six years in addition to serving as its chairman. In his second term during 2002–2003 he was the chief elected official for workforce development for the region in Southern Indiana around Clark County. He founded Galligan Construction in 1968 and worked with Irish Park Construction from 1980 to 1996.

=== First term ===
In 1995, Galligan won a three-way race between Bob Potter and Sheryl Yoder in the Democratic primary with 48% of the vote. He then won the general election with 72% of the vote against Republican challenger Melody Carrico.

Galligan officially began his first term with his first City Council meeting on January 2, 1996. During this term he married City Attorney Ann Marrie Sedwick in 1997. Galligan would also serve as mayor when the Ohio River reached flood stage declaring a local disaster emergency. Floodgates were ordered up, the police department was asked to help enforce barricades for people ignoring them, and worked with the council to help with drainage plans. Galligan also established the position of Deputy Mayor in 1997 in conjunction with the city council.

=== Second term ===
Again in 1999 Galligan won a three-way race against John Perkins and Glenn Muncy in the Democratic primary with 50% of the vote. Galligan then won the general election with 72% of the vote in another three-way race between Independent Robert Cook and Jac'kee' Cooper.

Galligan served as mayor from 2000 to the end of 2003 after a successful re-election campaign. He worked with the city council to work towards purchasing the Quadrangle to possibly relocate the City Hall there. The city council worked on passing resolutions from 2001 to 2003 to move towards buying the Quadrangle. Following Galligan's term, Mayor Rob Waiz worked with the council further to remodel and relocate to the new offices. During 2002 Galligan stopped attending council meetings in the later part of the year due to disagreements with the council and returned to them in early 2003. The disagreements ranged from purchase issues of police vehicles and decisions that resulted in lawsuits.

In 2003 Galligan lost to Councilman Rob Waiz in the Democratic primary. He finished second in a four-way race with Glenn Muncy and Ken Ogden. During Galligan's second term, he had poor relations with the city council. Waiz won the general election. Galligan blamed his poor council relations on Waiz for having a political agenda.

=== Third term ===
Galligan ran for election again in 2007. Galligan and Waiz had a controversial campaign due to things like Waiz buying possible domain names that could have been used by Galligan. Both candidates campaigns were brought under investigation for conduct such as the domain name purchase and campaign contributions. The Jeffersonville Ethics Commission handled all the investigations and found both campaigns to be in violation of the cities ethics law in regards to campaign contributions.

On May 8, 2007, Galligan won the Democratic Party primary for Mayor of Jeffersonville against the incumbent Rob Waiz. Galligan boasted as a big part of his campaign to improve a planned retail shopping center titled The Jeffersonville Town Center which was introduced in 2002 and it still hasn't been developed. He faced Republican Monty Snelling in the general election in November 2007. On November 6, 2007, Galligan won the mayor race against Monty Snelling.

Galligan assumed his office as Mayor of Jeffersonville on January 1, 2008, following his successful campaign for his third term. Galligan attended a five-day National League of Cities conference in New Orleans in December prior to officially becoming mayor. This incident would later become questioned by local citizens because of the excessive personal expenses that were paid for by the city, in the time of a budgeting crisis.

Galligan announced on December 18, 2007, that he would appoint Tony Harrod as chief of the Fire Department, replacing Clark Miles. Tim Deeringer was his appointment as Police Chief, replacing John Monihon. He made several other appointments as well in both departments as the city prepared for a large annexation of about 7,800 acres (32 km^{2}) of land and about 9,000 citizens. Galligan also appointed Bob Manor as parks chief in which his background and experience weren't in parks management. Manor succeeds Rob Poff.

On January 11, 2008, Galligan hired former councilman John Perkins to perform a sewer audit for the city. Perkins lost his re-election bid for his council seat in the November 2007 general election. The media raised questions about the hiring of Perkins due to him not having experience in sewer systems. Galligan responded to those questions saying "Why not Perkins, He's available."

Galligan announced in late January that government spending levels will be maintained at 2007 levels until the 2008 budget can be approved by the state due to the property tax crisis in Indiana. This was in conjunction with the Indiana Department of Local Government Finance asking all Indiana counties to suspend their new budgets.

Galligan ran for a fourth term as mayor during the 2011 mayoral election. His campaign was marred by the arrest of a campaign supporter on campaign fraud charges in another part of the state. Galligan lost to the Republican challenger, Mike Moore, a longtime local business owner and Clark County Commissioner.

On November 20, the Clark County Commissioners appointed Galligan to the county Board of Aviation Commissioners, an appointed body charged with oversight of the Clark Regional Airport.

== See also ==
- List of mayors of Jeffersonville, Indiana
- List of Knights of Columbus members
