= Our Lady of Providence (disambiguation) =

Our Lady of Providence is a Roman Catholic devotion to Mary, the mother of Jesus.

Our Lady of Providence may also refer to:

- Our Lady of Divine Providence School, Metairie, Louisiana
- Our Lady of Providence Elementary School, Ontario
- Our Lady of Providence Junior-Senior High School, Clarksville, Indiana
- Our Lady of Providence Seminary, Providence, Rhode Island
