= Rob Waiz =

Robert L. Waiz, Jr

Mayor of Jeffersonville
- In office January 1, 2004 – December 31, 2007
- Preceded by: Tom Galligan
- Succeeded by: Tom Galligan

Jeffersonville City Council
- In office January 1, 2000 – December 31, 2003

Personal details
- Born: January 30, 1963 (age 63) Louisville, Kentucky
- Party: Democratic
- Occupation: Mayor

Robert L. Waiz Jr (born January 30, 1963) is a politician of Jeffersonville, Indiana. He works in real estate and has been on the city council and served as mayor. Waiz, a Democrat, was first elected mayor in 2003, defeating two-term incumbent Tom Galligan in the May Democratic primary and then defeating Republican Monty Snelling in the November general election. On May 8, 2007, he lost the Democratic primary against Galligan; who went on to win the general election in November 2007. Rob Waiz was the youngest mayor elected in the city's modern history.

== Biography ==
Robert L. Waiz Jr was born January 30, 1963, in Louisville, Kentucky, to Bob and Barbara Waiz. He and his sister were raised in Jeffersonville. Waiz is a graduate of Our Lady of Providence High School class of 1981 in Clarksville, Indiana, and Indiana University Southeast in 1986 with a Bachelors in Business Management. He and his wife, Susan, have two children Lena and Robert. On January 11, 2011, Waiz announced that he will seek the mayor's office again this year. He'll challenge current Mayor Tom Galligan — who ousted him in the May 2007 primary — and Clark County Commissioner Mike Moore for the Democratic Party's nod in May's primary.

Waiz is a local businessman who runs Waiz Real Estate and Taggart-Waiz Insurance Center founded by his father Robert L. Waiz Sr. Additionally his career in the political field has brought him a mixture of experience from serving on the Jeffersonville planning commission, the city council, and as mayor.

=== Elections ===
Rob Waiz served as a councilman for one term and during that term he served as the vice-president and president of the council. Waiz continued to advance politically in 2003 as he filed to run for mayor against Tom Galligan, a two-term incumbent. Waiz defeated Galligan in a four-way primary race. Waiz won the general election and served as mayor.

In May 2007 Rob Waiz lost the Democratic Party primary election to challenger Tom Galligan, who won the general election. Following the election, Mayor Waiz filed a complaint with the Clark County Prosecutor Steve Stewart that several laws regarding the absentee ballots had been violated. Stewart filed a petition for a special prosecutor to be appointed to avoid a conflict of interest because Stewart's wife was working for the Galligan administration. Clark Circuit Court Judge Daniel Donahue appointed Ronald Simpson as special prosecutor from Corydon, Indiana.

=== Mayor ===
Waiz assumed office and presided over his first council meeting on January 5, 2004. On January 11, 2004, a fire devastated a city block in the historical district. Waiz worked with the businesses, the city council, and talked with then governor Joe Kernan during the following months regarding the incident to help restore the area.

On November 21, 2005, the city council passed a smoking ordinance and Waiz signed it into effect shortly after. This made Jeffersonville the first community in the Southern Indiana Louisville Metro area to pass such an ordinance.

On December 1, 2006, Waiz campaigned to abolish the City Court to save taxpayers money. This was brought up because City Judge Vicki Carmichael was elected to the Clark County Superior Court bench and was set to take office on January 1, 2007. Rather than continue the court system, Waiz wanted to abolish the court like many other cities have done previously in Indiana in an effort to reduce costs. His campaign didn't succeed. Also during 2006 Waiz helped negotiate a $5 million offer to help aid the Jeffersonville Town Center commercial center development by Vision Land Development, which has been in the works since 2002. The $5 million became $7 million in January 2007 with additional funds from the city's TIF district. This was a major issue in Waiz's reelection campaign. Galligan criticized the Waiz administration for failing to move the project forward while Galligan promised to develop the project. No stores have opened in the Town Center as of 2010.

Waiz signed an ethics law which would be enforced by a commission of members from an unbiased political stance in 2006. This created the Jeffersonville Ethics Commission. During Waiz's 2007 campaign he asked for the removal of the Ethics Commission's attorney Larry Wilder on April 10, 2007. Waiz claimed that Wilder secretly supported the Galligan campaign because his wife, Peggy, had a mass postage address that she lets anyone use. Waiz was answered the next day with Wilder stands by the Ethics Commission. Wilder used to be the a city assistant attorney in the Waiz administration until a public falling-out in January 2006 in which Wilder resigned. Wilder now works as an attorney for the Galligan administration.

During his tenure, Waiz concentrated on economic development and job creation. He was successful in having the State of Indiana certify the North Port Business Centre as the state's last technology park. The designation led to Heartland Payment Systems, Inc., building a 120,000-square-foot (11,000 m^{2}) facility; Key Electronics, Inc., building a 100,000-square-foot (9,300 m^{2}) facility and MedVenture Technology Corp. relocating its headquarters from Louisville. Waiz worked with Governor Mitch Daniels to craft a $4.4 million incentive package for MedVenture.

Waiz also oversaw the completion of Jeffersonville's portion of the Ohio River Greenway. The project included walking and bike paths along the Ohio River, which will eventually connect to New Albany, Indiana. The Waiz administration purchased the dilapidated River Falls Motel and Lounge in downtown Jeffersonville, which was converted into condominiums by a private developer.

Waiz presided over the relocation of the city's offices from the City-County Building to its own city hall at the historic Quartermaster Depot. The city also built two new fire stations, a new city garage and community center while Waiz was mayor.

After losing the primary in May 2007, Waiz had a very active end to his term. Waiz issued several vetoes of the city council for salary wages and a planned annexation. The council overturned the mayor's vetoes. The annex was overturned on August 20, 2007 and the salary wages were overturned on December 21, 2007. Waiz opposed both measures saying they were too costly.

== See also ==
- List of mayors of Jeffersonville, Indiana
