= Vissing =

Vissing may refer to:

- Vissing (name)
- Sønder Vissing Runestone
- Vissing-Hadsten HK
- Vissing Priory
