= Mans Hulden =

American researcher

Assistant Professor Mans Hulden
- Education: Ph.D. University of Arizona
- Scientific career
- Institutions: University of Colorado Boulder; New College of Florida
- Thesis: Finite-state Machine Construction Methods and Algorithms for Phonology and Morphology (2009)
- Doctoral advisor: Michael Hammond
- Website: verbs.colorado.edu/~mahu0110/

Mans Hulden (Swedish Måns Huldén) is a researcher and associate professor in computational linguistics. Before moving to the New College of Florida in 2024, he taught courses in computational linguistics, phonetics, and phonology at the University of Colorado Boulder. He is the creator and maintainer of the free and open source finite-state toolkit Foma.

Before moving to the University of Colorado in 2014, he was a Marie Curie fellow at the University of Helsinki, and an Ikerbasque visiting professor in Computer Science at the University of the Basque Country. Prior to that, Hulden received his PhD in linguistics from the University of Arizona in 2009, and did postdoctoral work in Helsinki as a Marie Curie Fellow. His research focuses on modelling and learning natural language structure, particularly in the domains of morphology and phonology. He often employs and develops formal and machine learning methods to this end.

Dr. Hulden has worked extensively with linguistic applications of finite-state technology, modeling of linguistic theory, grammatical inference, and the development of language resources. He is the author of several open-source tools for finite-state language modeling.

== Foma (software) ==
Hulden was the creator of the Foma tool that works with automata and transducers. Foma consists of a compiler, a programming language, and a C library. Writing a set of rules in a special format, Foma converts them into finite-state transducers and automata. Its implementation is highly efficient, and it is free software. Foma is a tool for working on computational morphology, but is equally useful in any other type of finite-state applications.

As free software, Foma has contributed decisively to the creation of an effective spellchecker for the Basque language (Xuxen). Hulden did this in collaboration with the Basque researcher Iñaki Alegría. Xuxen rules and lexicons were already implemented with the XFST program, but XFST was not free software. Redefined with Foma in 2011, the Xuxen corrector could be fully integrated into free-distribution programs, hence Foma's importance for the Basque language. Subsequently, Alegria and Hulden have collaborated on the standardisation of ancient texts in Basque.
