= Case role =

Case roles, according to the work by Charles J. Fillmore (1967), are the semantic roles of noun phrases (NP) in relation to the syntactic structures that contain these noun phrases. The term case role is most widely used for purely semantic relations, including theta roles and thematic roles, that can be independent of the morpho-syntax. The concept of case roles is related to the larger notion of Case (with a capitalised C), which is defined as a system of marking dependent nouns for the type of semantic or syntactic relationship they bear to their heads. Case traditionally refers to inflectional marking.

The relationships between nouns and their containing structures are of both syntactic and semantic value. The syntactic positional relationships between forms in sentences vary cross-linguistically and allows grammarians to observe semantic values in these nouns by examining their syntactic values. Using these semantic values gives the base for considering case roles in a specific language.

In addition to its inventory of structural cases, case theory includes a series of lexical cases that are assigned at deep structure in conjunction with theta role assignment. In addition to its relation to Case (case based on syntactic structures), these semantic notions of case role are also closely related to morphological case.

== Inventory of case roles ==
The following list of case roles is frequently distinguished in literature but is not an exhaustive list, as there is no consensus on the universal inventory of roles, nor a universal agreement as to the correct assignment of constituents to roles.

Case Role	Description	Example
Patient	Fillmore refers to this case role as 'object' or 'objective' and can be described in three ways: 1. an entity viewed as existing in a state or undergoing change 2. an entity viewed as located or moving 3. an entity viewed as affected by an entity	1. The sky is blue.; 2. The lion is in the cave.; 3. The bird ate the worm.
Agent	An entity that performs an activity or brings about a change of state	The robots assembled the car.
Instrument	The means by which an activity or change of state is carried out	She squashed the spider with a slipper.
Experiencer	The creature experiencing an emotion or perception	They love music.
Location	The position of an entity, referring to both the temporal and spatial roles	The vase is on the table. or Canada Day is on a Tuesday.
Source	The point from which an entity moves or derives	They got news from home.
Destination	The point to or towards which an entity moves or is oriented	He turned to the altar and walked towards it.
Recipient	A sentient destination	She gave her spare change to the collectors.
Purpose	The purpose of an activity	He went to the Red Rooster for some take-out.
Beneficiary	The animate entity on whose behalf an activity is carried out	She did the shopping for her mother.
Manner	The way in which an activity is done or the way in which a change of state takes place	He did it with great skill.
Extent	The distance, area or time over which an activity is carried out or over which a state holds	It lasted the winter.
Possessor	The entity that possesses another entity	I saw John's golf clubs.

== Early contributions to case role ==
=== Roman Jakobson's work on case roles in Russian ===
In his article on the case system of Russian, Roman Jakobson (1958) closely examines case assignment and argues for a feature decomposition of case on the basis of semantic considerations. Jakobson (1958) proposed a three-feature binary case system for Russian case which includes the following: ±marginal, ±quantifying, and ±ascriptive, where the negative value is considered to be unmarked. The term marginal distinguishes the direct and non-direct cases; only the -marginal cases may occur in subject and object position. Quantifying indicates the relevance of the extent to which the noun is a participant in the event. Ascriptive puts emphasis on directionality.

Jakobson considers cases to be bundles of these three features, which can be assigned to morphological cases:

Case	Marginal	Quantifying	Ascriptive
Nominative	-	-	-
Accusative	-	-	+
Genitive 1	-	+	+
Genitive 2	-	+	-
Locative 1	+	+	+
Locative 2	+	+	-
Dative	+	-	+
Instrumental	+	-	-

He uses these decomposed case features to account for the case alternations in subject and object position, and argues for how there should be a universal inventory of case roles.

== Multiple case roles ==
There is a theory that multiple case roles can be assigned to noun phrases. The reasons for having more than one case role is due to the differences in the sentences’ semantic effects. Bhat (1997) proposed that the speaker of a language would have the option of assigning any single case role out of the multiple case role alternations available in a given context. This is not done by a transformational rule, but due to the deep structure representations (the core semantic relations of the sentence).

   Examples
  (1a) || John sprayed the wall with paint.
  (1b) || John sprayed paint on the wall.

In comparing sentences (1a) and (1b), it demonstrates that the surface structure representation for each sentence (the structure following the phonological form of the sentence) is different. However, in order to account for the meaning distinctions that exist in (1a) and (1b), it has been demonstrated that these distinctions are due to the differences in the deep structures of each sentence and can be resolved by assigning a different case role to the NP. With 'paint' acting as an instrument, and 'the wall' being the location, sentence (1a) might infer that all the paint was used, but that not necessarily all the wall was covered. Sentence (1b) might imply that the whole wall is covered, but that John did not use all the paint he had available to him.

=== Fillmore's alternative theory ===
Conversely, Fillmore (1968) suggested that in the case of sentences following the structure of the above examples, the noun phrases are not assigned multiple case roles, but instead retain the same case roles in both sentences (instrument for 'paint', and location for 'wall'). The difference in meaning is attributed to a transformation that takes both identical deep structures and chooses the direct object as it appears in the surface form.

=== Examples in Kannada ===
Kannada (a language spoken in India with overt usage of case in its suffixes) affords some good evidence of how multiple case roles can be assigned to NPs in the following two examples: (1) how NPs can be assigned either Object or Location case roles, and (2) how NPs can be assigned either Agent or Experiencer case roles.

Evidence for multiple case roles demonstrated in Kannada: NPs can be assigned either object or location case roles. Evidence is found from the meaning distinctions of exhaustiveness:

bekku maravannu hattitu
cat(NOM) tree(ACC) climbed
"The cat climbed the tree."

bekku marakke hattitu
cat(NOM) tree(DAT) climbed
"The cat climbed to the tree."

(2a) implies that the cat climbed the tree from the ground itself, whereas (2b) has no such implication. The common feature of these two uses is that whenever an element occurs as the object case role, it gets the added meaning of being exhaustively affected by the action denoted by the verb as seen in (2a) (like climbing up the tree completely from the ground upwards). No such additional meaning is observed in sentences in which the element has been used as a Location case role (as in 2b).

How NPs can be assigned either agent or experiencer case roles: Evidence found from the meaning distinctions of volition.

ra:ju pa:thavannu maretidda:ne
Raju(NOM) lesson(ACC) has-forgotten
"Raju has forgotten the lesson."

ra:juvige pa:tha maretide
Raju(DAT) lesson(NOM) forgotten
"The lesson has been forgotten by Raju."

Although both sentences indicate the same event, the meaning difference is due to the fact that in (3a) Raju, as the agent, is considered to have acted volitionally (not making any special effort to retain the lesson in his memory), and is hence held responsible for that event, whereas in (3b) he, being an experiencer, is involved in that event only non-volitionally, and hence one does not hold him responsible for it.

== Relating case roles to morphological case and structural Case ==
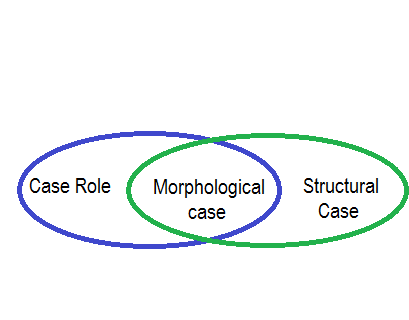
A Venn diagram demonstrating how case role (semantic roles) relates to the morphological case, and how morphological case in turn relates to Case (structural case).

=== Semantic vs. morphological ===
The semantic category of case (specifically case role) is related to morphological case. Morphological case (such as accusative, ergative, dative, genitive, and sometimes also partitive) reflects the ranking of arguments, while semantic case (such as instrumental, comitative, locative, and directional) encodes a semantic relation between the DP and the governing head. Morphological case is typical of complements and is licensed by structural Case. By contrast, semantic case is typical of adjuncts; it is only licensed by the meaning of the head. From the case roles proposed by Fillmore (1968), it was demonstrated that case roles appeared where the morphological cases of dative, genitive or instrumental appeared:

- The experiencer case role (dative in many languages)
- The recipient case role (dative in many languages)
- The possessor case role (genitive in many languages)
- The partitive case role (genitive or partitive in many languages)
- The instrument case role (instrumental or dative in many languages)

The following are observations from Sigurðsson on the "case-semantics" in case-languages demonstrating how morphological case is not blind to semantics:

- Agentive subjects are nominative
- Indirect objects are either dative or accusative
- Most benefactive (indirect or direct) objects are dative
- Most malefactive (indirect or direct) objects are accusative
- Instrumental DP-objects are dative
- If a lexical item has a choice between an accusative or a dative complement, then that choice is normally semantically controlled

=== Morphological vs. structural ===
Morphological case is related to structural Case (based on syntax) in the following ways:

Structural Case is a condition for arguments that originates from a relational head (e.g. verb), while morphological case is a property that depends on the NP or DP complement. The relationship between morphological case and structural case is evident in how morphological case is subject to case agreement whereby the morphological case appearing on a DP must be licensed by the syntactic context of the DP.

In much of the transformational grammar literature, morphological cases are viewed as determined by the syntactic configuration. The accusative case is assigned through a structural relation between the verbal head and its complement. For example, the direct complement of a verb is assigned accusative, irrespective of any other properties that it might have. It must be acknowledged that it is not the accusative alone that is structural, rather the specifier of a NP is in the genitive in many languages, and so is the direct object of a nominalized verb.

== Morphological case ==
=== Linguistic typology of morphological case ===
Case can be further divided into two categories: grammatical cases and semantic cases. Examples of grammatical cases are nominative case, accusative, dative, and ergative. These typically code core grammatical relations which are semantically dependent on the verb, such as subject and object. Semantic (or adverbial) cases are instrumental, comitative, and locative cases. These are semantically richer and less dependent on the verb. There exist cases, such as dative, that have both semantic and grammatical case features.

Eight commonly seen cases (Indo-European case):

Case	Characteristics
Nominative	Indicates the subject, as the specifier of a finite verb; Recent research indicates nominative is distinct from ergative case; Some research indicates nominative is synonymous to ergative case
Accusative	Indicates the direct object, as the complement of a transitive verb; Lexical case associated with themes; Ex. The teacher scolded us.
Dative	Indicates the indirect object of a verb; Lexical case associated with goals/experiences; Ex. The banker handed us a pamphlet. Ex. The banker handed a check to us.
Instrumental	Indicates an object used in performing an action; Ex. We cleaned the table with a wipe. Ex. Written by hand.
Locative	Indicates a location; Ex. We live in Canada.
Vocative	Indicates an addressee; Ex. Becky, are you mad? Ex. Hello, Maria!
Genitive	Corresponds to English’s possessive case and preposition of, indicates the possessor of another noun
Ablative	Indicates movement from something, or cause

Precise description of the above cases vary cross-linguistically.

Ergative case

It has been suggested that the lexical case associated with agents is the ergative (ERG) lexical case: it identifies the noun as a subject of a transitive verb in languages that allow ergative case. The correlation demonstrated between the ergative case and the theta role of the agent is not a perfect correlation: It is as closely correlated as the relationship between the dative case and the theta role goals/ experiencers. There are two types of ergative languages: languages that allow ergative subjects in intransitive clauses and those that prohibit them.

There can be a distinction made between ergative and accusative type languages with respect to the type of subject and object markings they will display. This distinction is characterized by the type of clauses a language allows, such as ergative, absolutive, accusative, and nominative. The distinction made between language type and clause type is illustrated in the table below:

Clause type	Language type	
Clause type	Ergative	Accusative
Transitive	Erg-Abs	Nom-Acc
Intransitive	Abs	Nom

Case assignment

The typological differences among languages have been shown to be the consequence of differences in whether ergative, dative, or other individual case assignment is optional or obligatory in a language (although, the ergative-accusative case pattern appears to be universally blocked).

The class of verbs that mark their subjects with a particular lexical dative case is similar across languages, but the inclusion in this verb class is not completely predictable. Lexical cases such as nominative usually mark predictable theta roles, but there is a substantial amount of characteristic behaviour involved indicating that a verb's ability to assign a lexical case to one of its arguments must be specified in that verb's lexical entry. Once a verb marks its subject with a given lexical case, such as nominative, that verb cannot assign the structural accusative case to its object.

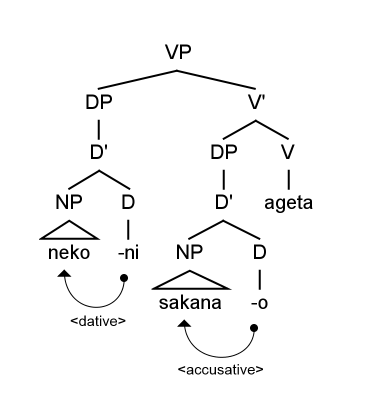
Example of transliterated Japanese morphologically overt case assignment. The dative particle '-ni' assigns a recipient case role to the NP 'neko', and the accusative particle '-o' assigns a theme case role to the NP 'sakana'.

Morphologically overt case assignment

In languages with case marking of explicit morphology, any nominal that is morphologically capable of showing case morphology is obligated to do so. This observation can be stated explicitly by what is referred to as the Case Filter. Case Filter can be further described as being an abstract Case hypothesis that stipulates all lexical noun phrases are assigned a specific Case regardless if this Case manifests at the surface level: If this lexical NP does not have a Case marking at surface structure, then the sentence that contains it is considered ungrammatical. Case theory includes an inventory of structural Case and a series of lexical cases that are assigned (in all languages) at the level of the deep structure in conjunction with theta role assignment.

Languages such as Russian and Japanese follow a similar mechanism of case assignment as that seen in Latin. Russian is like Latin, in that it does have genitive and dative case that is assigned by the N (noun) and A (adjective or adverb). In Russian for example, most nouns show overt case morphology as does Latin, but there is also a productive class of indeclinable nouns. These indeclinable nouns are not able to receive case morphology. Examples from languages exhibiting morphologically overt case marking indicate that there are rules of case assignment present in the grammar of a language. To account for this, rules can be generated as support. For example, support accounting for accusative cases in Latin-type case-marked languages could be presented as:

(i)	V (verb) and P (preposition) assign accusative case to an NP complement Accusative case is assigned to the complements of V and in some instances P
(ii)	N (noun) and A (adverb/adjective) do not assign accusative case (to an NP complement) Accusative case is not found on the complement of either N or A

Application of these accusative case assignment rules can be seen in the following examples:

VP scripsit libr-um
{} wrote book-ACC

PP ad Hispani-am
{} to Spain-ACC

For the morphologically rich case language of Latin, there are seven cases for Latin nouns. The following table demonstrates Latin case morphology assignment for a masculine noun somnus, meaning 'sleep'.

Case	Singular form	Plural form
Nominative nominativus	somnus	somni
Accusative accusativus	somnum	somnos
Genitive genitivus	somni	somnorum
Dative dativus	somno	somnis
Ablative ablativus	somno	somnis
Locative locativus	somni	somnis
Vocative vocativus	somne	somni

Modern German

In modern German, all noun phrases show case forms with case generally being marked on the determiner. However, for the genitive form German marks the noun with a morphologically overt case form (this case form is retained on noun phrases in modern English, surfacing as -'s). The following table illustrates the masculine case forms of German.

Case	"the man"	"he"
Nominative	der Mann	er (he)
Accusative	den Mann	ihn (him)
Dative	dem Mann	ihm ((to) him)
Genitive	des Mannes	sein (his)

=== Case hierarchy ===
Schematic representation of nominative-accusative alignment. Subject of intransitive verb (S) and subject of transitive verb (A) are treated similarly while object of transitive verb (O or P) is treated differently.

Schematic representation of ergative-absolutive alignment. Subject of intransitive verb (S) and object of transitive verb (O or P) are treated similarly while subject of transitive verb (A) is treated differently.

As discussed in linguistic typology of morphological case, there can be a number of cases found within a single language. In a sample of case systems, they appear in a particular order and a hierarchy emerges. This specific ordering is called the case hierarchy.

Nominative/Absolutive → Accusative/Ergative → Genitive → Dative → Ablative/Instrumental → Other oblique arguments

This hierarchy is to be interpreted as follows: If a language has a case that is listed on the hierarchy, it will usually have at least one case from each position to the left. If a language has a dative case, it will have a genitive (position to the left), an accusative or ergative case or both, and a nominative.

While the case hierarchy holds for many languages, it is not universally valid. Some languages may lack one of the above categories or may collapse categories into one hierarchy position. There are times when none of the cases in one system will correspond with any of the cases in the other system. For example, the dative in Ancient Greek does not correspond closely with the dative of Latin. So when comparing cases across languages, the functions of a particular case need to be considered, rather than the labels the language has assigned.

==== Examples of two case and three case systems within the case hierarchy ====
The hierarchy predicts that it is possible for a language to only have two cases. There are a number of languages that have a two-case system, such as Chemeheuvi, Kabardian, as well as in Iranian languages. Chemeheuvi is a language of the Numic branch of Uto-Aztecan family which has a nominative-oblique system. Yagnobi, an Iranian language, has both an accusative and ergative case.

Semitic languages, Nubian languages, Modern Greek operate with a three-case systems, with a nominative, accusative, and genitive/oblique case.

== Structural Case ==
=== Examples of Structural Case in English ===
Morphological Case is the surface Case form which is assigned to either a noun phrase or a pronoun phrase depending on its surface position within a sentence. English case morphology is very sparse or in some instances, non-existent. The distribution of nominals in languages such as English, where there is a lack of case morphology, is governed by the same precise laws that also regulate nominative and accusative case in morphologically overt case-marked languages such as Latin and Russian. For example the distribution of accusative case:

Accusative case assignment:

α assigns accusative case to β only if:

iii. α is V or P (not N or A); and
iv. β is the complement of α

In English, the object of a noun phrase is assigned a Case by the closest c-commanding V (verb) or P (preposition) head, which is usually the verb or preposition that selects it as a complement. Similarly, the subject of a noun phrase is assigned Case from the finite tense head, T. The subject of a finite clause in English is nominative. As seen in English with sentences in passive form, the finite T is the head that assigns the nominative Case to the noun phrase (subject position); the closest noun phrase that T (tense head) c-commands is attracted to the empty specifier position of the tense phrase. This movement is a local specifier-to-specifier movement, satisfying Case requirements at the deep-structure level. Any sentence in English that surfaces with a noun phrase not containing Case, is a violation of the Case Filter and thus is said to 'crash' (determined to be ungrammatical).

	NP complements in English	Examples
(5a)	V and P allow an NP complement.	[VP wrote the book] [PP to Spain]
(5b)	N and A do not allow an NP complement.	*[NP love liberty] [*AP free luxuries]

Although English does not have non-zero case morphology, except with respect to personal pronouns, it satisfies the Case Filter. The phenomenon of phonologically zero case morphology is found in languages where the presence of a rich case system is not in doubt. English has an abstract or non-overt variant of case. For example, accusative case may be assigned to a nominal complement of V (verb) or P (preposition) by either V (verb) or P (preposition), but these complements receiving case show no overt morphology reflecting this process. English lacks formal cases such as vocative case and ablative case (which can be assigned to nominals); complements to the heads assigning case will not receive an abstract marking of case, and will be excluded by the case filter.

	Differences between English and Latin	Similarities between English and Latin
(6a)	Case morphology in English is phonologically zero (excluding personal pronouns)	English has accusative case, but not dative and ablative like Latin
(6b)	English allows nominal complements in the same contexts Latin assigns accusative case	English does not allow bare nominal complements in the same locations that Latin disallows accusative case

Pronouns in English, however, change forms when they change case. These changes are clearly seen with personal pronouns for example: first person, second person, and third person are represented as 'I', 'you', and 'he' or 'she', respectively. Subjects of active voice sentences typically in English take on the nominative Case and objects the accusative Case.

Personal pronouns in English can be classified into three Case categories:

Case	Used for	Example
Nominative	NOM marks the subject of a finite verb; Sometimes for the complement of a copula	Subjective pronouns: I, he, she, we, they Example: "They want an A"
Accusative	The direct or indirect object of a verb; The object of a preposition (in some languages); Sometimes for the complement of a copula; ACC is marked on the noun that is having something done to it; Syntactic function: designates the immediate object of an action	Object pronouns: me, him, her, us, them Example: "The teacher scolded us"
Genitive	GEN marks the grammatical possessor; GEN marking for the possessor can be seen as -'s and as possessive pronouns	Possessive pronouns: my/mine, his, her(s), our(s), your(s), their(s) Example: "That is our pen"

English has case forms for pronouns for genitive, accusative, and nominative cases. Conversely, English has only genitive case forms for 'full noun phrases' (or determiner phrases): For example, "John's blue cat" is assigned genitive case. Full noun phrases cannot be assigned accusative or nominative case. The possessive marking -'s as a case ending attaches to the end of a noun phrase, not necessarily to the head noun itself.

Example: English Noun Phrase Marked with Genitive Case

[_{NP} [_{NP} The boy] -'s_{poss} ball]

It is a question of present-day research, why is it that with pronouns in English, Case marking is preserved? A proposed answer has been that since pronouns are a closed category and don't partake in productive morphology, then they are in a way "memorized" by speakers of English. The fact that they may be just memorized forms suggests that there is no significant reason for why members of this category should undergo a drastic change, losing morphologically overt Case marking. Considering this argument, why then do noun phrases receive genitive Case marking in English? The notion of abstract Case marking on all noun phrases can help answer this question: All noun phrases undergo Case marking assignment but this is not always phonetically realized at the surface structure (the exception to surfacing of this morphological case is the possessive form -'s).

There is a phenomenon in English known as exceptional case-marking (ECM), which makes it evident that accusative case is not necessarily assigned to the complement of the assigner. The following example is intended to demonstrate that case can be assigned as long as there is no barrier that intervenes, and given that there is no nominal closer in proximity to the assigner than the assignee. For example (* indicates an ungrammaticality):

	Examples
(7a)	Mary believes [Sue to have read the book].
(7b)	*Mary's belief [Sue to have read the book].
(7c)	Sue was believed [_ to have read the book].

== Debate about case role ==
There have been arguments made for case role to be considered a universal in language, for several reasons. In previous studies, primarily during the early 20th century, where case role in languages was considered using Latin or Greek classification, it was found that there were difficulties in approaching other languages such as Aleut or Thai. These methods involved illustrating semantic relationships of given case forms and did not come from a primarily syntactical standpoint. Case role in Latin and Greek classifications tended to neglect nominative case as well, and instead focused on creating different semantic classes for other cases, such as the dative of possession.

Because there have been several such problems analyzing case role cross-linguistically when using one language as a standard, it is not common practice to take traditional Latin or Greek classifications. Instead, the particular languages' syntactic structure forms the base for analyzing semantic value and case role in that language.

There are still questions regarding case morphology. One approach to defining case morphology is to say that it is the presence of some special morphology, the shape of which has a correlation with a specific syntactic position. Decades of past research support this being a particular cross-linguistic property specific to nominals. When discussing case features, it is commonly stated that they have no associated semantic interpretation, regardless of their syntactic position. An early perspective taken on case was the initial suggestion by French linguist Jean-Roger Vergnaud that the grammar of case is a cross-linguistic feature, central to the syntax of all languages and that it does not just apply to languages with a rich case morphology, such as Latin. Vergnaud stipulated that any nominal that is morphologically able to show case morphology is required and must do so. This observation was explicitly stated above as being the definition of Case Filter. A second perspective on Case is Chomsky's Minimalist conjectures. There are many fundamental questions regarding case role, such as the reason why case should even exist, that are not yet accompanied by substantive answers. This indicates that research on case role remains still as a "work in progress".

== See also ==
- Case grammar
- Case hierarchy
- Grammatical case
- Thematic relations
- Theta roles
