= Clark Regional Airport =

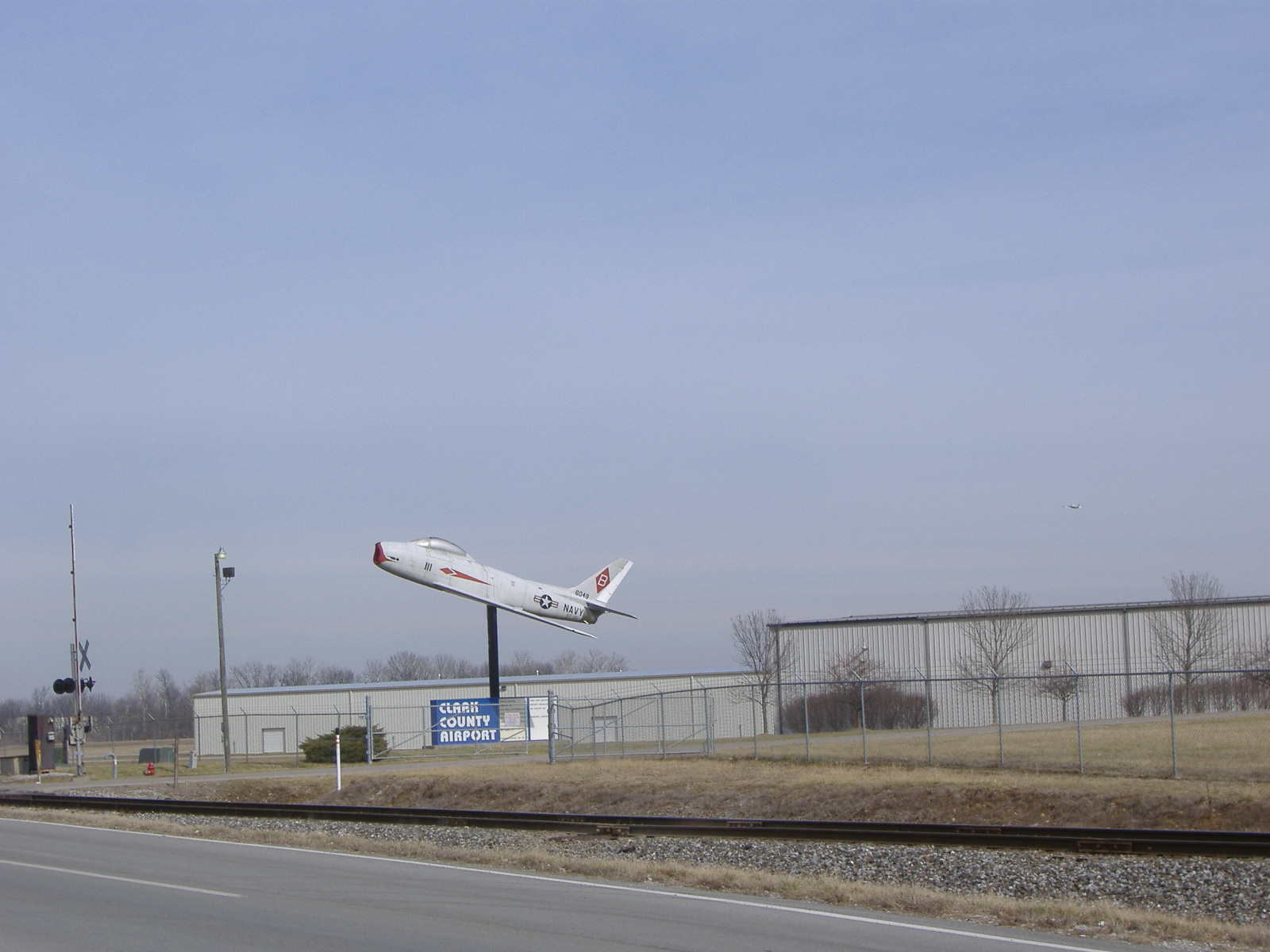
- IATA: none; ICAO: KJVY; FAA LID: JVY

Summary
- Airport type: Public
- Owner: South Central Regional Airport Authority
- Serves: Clark County, Louisville MSA
- Location: Jeffersonville / Sellersburg
- Elevation AMSL: 474 ft (144 m)
- Coordinates: 38°21′56″N 085°44′18″W
- Website: flywithjvy.com

Map
- Location of airport in Indiana JVY (the United States)

Runways
Direction	Length		Surface
Direction	ft	m	Surface
18/36	7,000	2,134	Asphalt
14/32	3,899	1,188	Asphalt

Statistics
- Aircraft operations (2010): 67,922
- Based aircraft (2017): 122
- Source: Federal Aviation Administration

Clark Regional Airport (ICAO: KJVY, FAA LID: JVY) is a public use airport in Clark County, Indiana, United States. The airport is owned by the South Central Regional Airport Authority. It is located five nautical miles (9 km) north of the central business district of Jeffersonville, Indiana, in the town of Sellersburg. It is also seven miles (11 km) north of Louisville.

This facility is included in the National Plan of Integrated Airport Systems for 2017–2021, which categorized it as a general aviation reliever airport. Although many U.S. airports use the same three-letter location identifier for the FAA and IATA, Clark Regional Airport is assigned JVY by the FAA but has no designation from the IATA.

== History ==
Clark Regional Airport has been in operation since 1981. Initially, it was managed by the Clark County Board of Aviation Commissioners. In 2014, the South Central Regional Airport Authority was formed governed by Indiana's Local Airport Authorities Law which appears in Indiana Code 8-22-3. The South Central Regional Airport Authority (SCRAA) consists of five Board Members, as set forth in IC 8-22-3. As of 2016, the five-member board is composed of Thomas Galligan, President; James Baker, Vice President; Dan Gregory, Board Member; J. Greg Dietz, Board Member; and John Secor, Board Member/Airport Manager. The Board Secretary is Kris Brutscher. Since its inception, the SCRAA has had no financial support in the form of a tax levy from Clark County, Indiana. Its revenue is derived through leases, fuel flow fees, landing fees, user fees, farming, and other miscellaneous sources of income.

== Facilities and aircraft ==
Clark Regional Airport supports two Fixed-Base Operators (FBOs), Aircraft Specialists and Honaker Aviation; four Commercial Operators (COs), JR Aviation, ATP Flight School, Jet Access Aviation, and Air Methods; one Hangar Owner (HO), Vampire Air Group; and one Military Aircraft Operator (MAO), Blue Sky Aviation; as well as various smaller tenants who reside on the airport which are/are not aircraft-oriented. These FBOs, COs, and MAOs employ many full-time and part-time employees, contributing to the economic growth of the surrounding communities. They have made investments in their buildings and properties. They also have substantial investments in aircraft, equipment, supplies and inventory.

Clark Regional Airport is currently undergoing an extension of Runway 18-36 from its existing 5,500 feet to 7,000 feet. The extension of Runway 18-36 will improve safety for aircraft and allow Clark Regional Airport to better accommodate larger planes. The commercial businesses that have and continue to relocate to the expanding River Ridge Commerce Center will find Clark Regional Airport's convenient and easily accessible location is ideal for their corporate travel and industrial shipping needs. Through the completion of the East End Bridge from Jefferson County, Kentucky, business located in the East End of Jefferson County, Kentucky, will find it easier to commute to and from the area in order to utilize Clark Regional Airport rather than Bowman Field.

Clark Regional Airport, through land acquisitions partially funded by the Federal Aviation Administration (FAA) and Indiana Department of Transportation (INDOT), has increased its footprint for future development of the surrounding property, making it an ideal location for the booming Southern Indiana economic and industrial growth that the region is currently experiencing.

Clark Regional Airport covers an area of 800 acres (324 ha) at an elevation of 474 feet (144 m) above mean sea level. It has two runways with asphalt surfaces: 18/36 is 7,000 by 100 feet (2,134 by 30 m) and 14/32 is 3,899 by 75 feet (1,188 by 23 m).

For the 12-month period ending December 31, 2010, the airport had 67,922 aircraft operations, an average of 186 per day: 88% general aviation and 12% air taxi. In January 2017, there were 122 aircraft based at this airport: 95 single-engine, 9 multi-engine, 9 jet and 9 helicopters.

== See also ==
- List of airports in Indiana
