= Dale Orem =

American businessman, politician and civic leader

Dale L. Orem

Jeffersonville City Council
- In office January 1, 1968 – December 31, 1972

Mayor of Jeffersonville
- In office January 1, 1984 – December 31, 1991
- Preceded by: Richard Vissing
- Succeeded by: Raymond Parker

Personal details
- Born: April 24, 1938 (age 88)
- Party: Republican
- Education: University of Louisville
- Occupation: Retired

Dale L. Orem (born April 24, 1938) is an American businessman, politician and civic leader who served as mayor of Jeffersonville, Indiana from 1984 to 1991. Orem was active in sports by playing for the University of Louisville and later coaching at the school. Orem was also a National Football League (NFL) official.

== Biography ==
Orem attended the University of Louisville and participated in the sports program there before graduating in 1960. Orem played for the school's undefeated baseball team in 1957. Orem was the quarterback for the school's football team, which he led to a victory over Drake, 34–20, in the Sun Bowl in 1958. From 1969 to 1973, he was the head coach of the Louisville Cardinals baseball team.

His other sports functions have included a stint as an NFL official from 1980 to 1998. He served as a line judge in Super Bowl XXX. Orem wore uniform number 51 (currently worn by Carl Cheffers) for the major part of his career. He and his family (including his late wife, Kay) have operated the Locker Room Sporting Goods store in Jeffersonville since the early 1960s.

Dale Orem's service in public office began with a four-year duration on the Jeffersonville city council in 1968 to 1972 and extended to his two terms as mayor in 1984 to 1991. He has also been involved in many local civic organizations such as the Jeffersonville Jaycees, Jeffersonville Optimist Club, KIDPA, Red Cross, and Jeff Main Street. Prior to his retirement, he also served as chairman for Heritage Bank of Southern Indiana and was the founding executive director (in 1991) of the Community Foundation of Southern Indiana. In 2003, he received the school's highest honor, the Indiana University Southeast Chancellor's Medallion, for work done with the school and in other civic organizations.

== See also ==
- List of mayors of Jeffersonville, Indiana
