= Voer Abbey =

Former Benedictine abbey in Denmark

Coordinates: 56°2′22″N 9°41′36″E

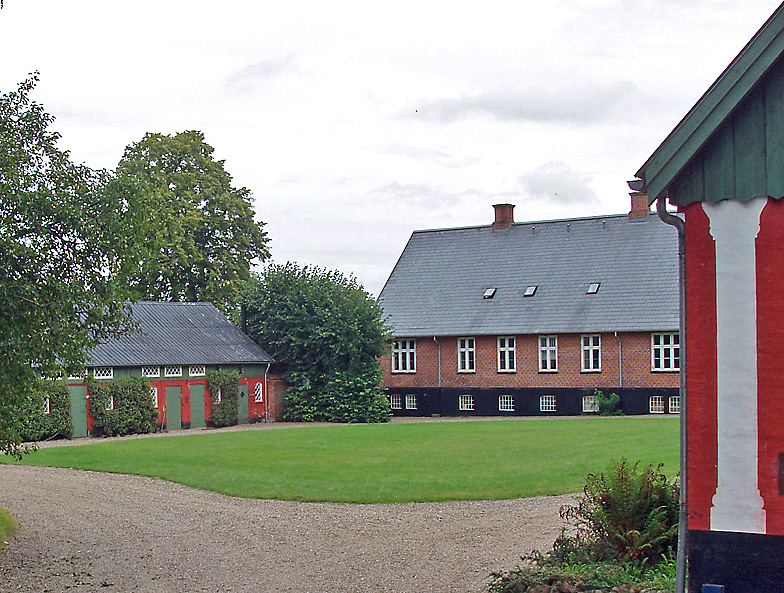
Klostermølle is located on the site of the former Voer Abbey

Voer Abbey (Danish: Voer Kloster) was a Benedictine abbey in Voerladegård Parish in Skanderborg Municipality, Denmark. It was situated on the Gudenå River near Klostermølle, site of the former monastery mill.

== History ==
The abbey was founded before 1100 as one of the oldest Benedictine Abbeys in Denmark. Voer Abbey was relatively wealthy and over the hundreds of years of its existence came into possession of many income-producing properties as far as Southern Jutland and as far north as Mors Island and Thisted. The abbey owned many farms and churches in the area from which it derived additional income. In 1172 the monks diverted the water of the Gudenå River into a 1300-metre canal they dug to Mossø Lake, to operate a grist mill. Just a hundred years later the population was halved according to the Øm Abbey Chronicle.

Vissing Priory (Vissing Kloster) was founded as a double abbey for nuns of the Benedictine Order on the other side of the river across from Voer Abbey. In 1244 there was a peasant uprising and in the campaign to regain control Voer Abbey and Vissing Priory for Benedictine nuns across the river were looted, and Vissing was burned to the ground. The next hundred years were difficult for the abbey since many of the farms were destroyed and the peasants killed or fled. In 1486 the Benedictine abbey was reformed. The wealth of the community led to abuses and at the request of the bishop of the Diocese of Aarhus, the abbey was placed under the control of the Cistercians, whose reputation for strict observance of the rule was hoped would restore confidence in the house.

In 1536 Denmark became officially a Lutheran country and all religious houses and their property reverted to the crown as a consequence of the Reformation. Øm Abbey Chronicle states that at the time of the dissolution there were 20 monks at Voer. No mention is made of any nuns or the priory at Vissing. The abbey lands and gristmill became Voerladegaard, an income-producing property for the crown. In an unusual arrangement, the monks were permitted to remain at the abbey as a secular community to operate the mill and manage the farms. In 1552 the remaining monks were moved to nearby Øm Abbey (Øm Kloster). The abbey buildings were demolished in 1586. The materials were used for the expansion and fortifications at theformer Skanderborg Castle (Skanderborg Slot).

== Klostermølle ==
Klostermølle is located where the Gudenå River flows into lake Mossø. The buildings are located on the site of the former Voer Monastery. The site of the monastery, which has been excavated, is publicly accessible, although there are no visible remains. The existing buildings at the site are from a later period, but the restored canal still functions. Nothing remains of the original gristmill. In 1872, the mill was converted into a paper mill producing pulp and cardboard. It functioned as such until 1973.

The main building is rented by the environmental protecting organisation Natur & Ungdom. There is a nature school in the basement, a camp school on the ground floor, and the Natur & Ungdom secretariat is located on the first floor. The site is now open for recreational purposes and the public is admitted.
