= List of mayors of Jeffersonville, Indiana =

List of mayors of Jeffersonville, Indiana is a list from the first mayor to the current mayor of the city.

== History ==
Jeffersonville was founded in 1802 and was run by trustees until 1839 in which Dr. Nathaniel Field, a state legislator and trustee of Jeffersonville, secured legislation to make Jeffersonville a city. In April of that year the first mayor would be elected. The position would be a part-time position until 1964 with Mayor Richard Vissing becoming the first full-time mayor.

== List ==
#	Name	Term start	Term end	Party
1	Isaac Heiskell	1839	1843	
2	Christopher Peasley	1843	1845	
3	William Cross	1845	1848	
4	William F. Collum (1812–1866; aged 54)	1848	1854	
5	John D. Shryer (?–1872)	1854	1855	
6	Uriah Damron	1855	1856	
7	Thomas J. Downs	1856	1857	
8	William Lackey	1857	1858	
9	John D. Shryer	1858	1861	
10	O.C. Woolley (1808–1895; aged 87)	1861	1865	Democratic
11	John Ware	1865	1867	
12	Gabriel Poindexter (1827–1890; aged 62)	January 1, 1867	December 31, 1869	Republican
13	Levi Sparks	1869	1873	Democratic
14	Burdet C. Pile (1805–1985; aged 80)	1873	1875	Democratic
15	Luther Warder (1st) (1841–1902; aged 60)	1875	1883	Democratic
16	John M. Glass (1843–1925; aged 82)	1883	1885	Republican
17	Herman Preefer	1885	1887	Democratic
18	Luther Warder (2nd)	1887	1891	Democratic
19	Benjamin H. Robinson	1891	1894	Republican
20	Isaac Whiteside	1894	1898	Republican
21	Thomas Rader (1859–1904; aged 44)	January 1, 1898	December 31, 1902	Democratic
22	Abraham Schwaninger (1844–1906; aged 62)	1903	1904	Republican
23	Henry Burtt (1852–1932; aged 79)	January 1, 1904	December 31, 1906	Democratic
24	Edward N. Flynn	1907	1909	Republican
25	James E. Burke	1910	1912	Democratic
26	Jonas G. Howard Jr. (1886–1964; aged 78)	1913	1913	Democratic
27	Earnest W. Rauth	1914	1917	Democratic
28	Newton H. Meyers	1918	1921	Republican
29	Joseph Warder (1878–?)	1922	1925	Democratic
30	Harry Poindexter (1857–1937; aged 80)	January 1, 1926	December 31, 1929	Republican
31	Allen W. Jacobs	1930	1938	Republican
32	Homer Vawter (1894–1958; aged 64)	1939	1942	Republican
33	Samuel G. Shannon (1893–1975; aged 82)	1942	1951	Republican
34	Charles Hoodenpyl (1904–1986; aged 82)	1952	1963	Democratic
35	Richard Vissing (1915–1987; aged 72)	January 1, 1964	December 31, 1983	Democratic
36	Dale Orem (born in 1938; age 86)	January 1, 1984	December 31, 1991	Republican
37	Raymond Parker (born in 1937; age 87–88)	January 1, 1992	December 31, 1995	Democratic
38	Tom Galligan (1st) (born in 1946; age 78)	January 1, 1996	December 31, 2003	Democratic
39	Rob Waiz (born in 1963; age 62)	January 1, 2004	December 31, 2007	Democratic
40	Tom Galligan (2nd)	January 1, 2008	December 31, 2011	Democratic
41	Mike Moore	January 1, 2012	Present	Republican

Referenced from the Encyclopedia of Louisville.
