= Vissing Priory =

Benedictine nunnery in Denmark

Coordinates: 56°02′08″N 9°40′06″E

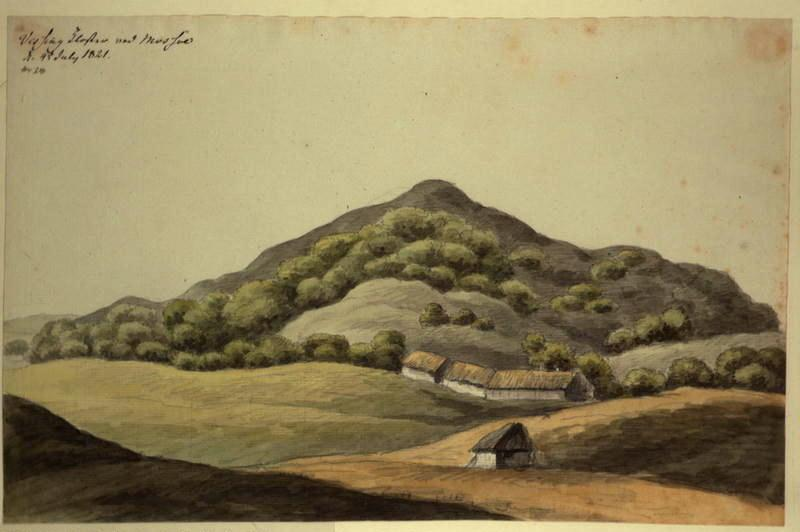
Vissing Priory, painted on 4 July 1821 by Ole Jørgen Rawert (1786-1851). Watercolor landscape depicting the monastery and surrounding countryside.

Vissing Priory (Danish: Vissing Kloster) was a Benedictine nunnery, situated near the monastery of Voer Abbey, but on the northern bank of the Gudenå, close to the present Klostermølle in Vorladegår parish near Silkeborg, Denmark.

== History ==
The nunnery was founded at an unknown date, probably in the mid-12th century, by one of the Bishops of Aarhus, possibly to function as a double monastery with the nearby Voer Abbey. Vissing Priory and Øm Abbey (Øm Kloster) each owned half of the Vosgårde, which was a mill with appurtenances; the two religious houses were in dispute over it for the greater part of their existence.

Vissing Priory was burnt down by troops of Abel, King of Denmark during civil conflict in 1244. To what extent it was rebuilt, if at all, is unknown. The site has not been systematically investigated since, although there have been a number of casual finds, and therefore little is known about it.

The nunnery was formally wound up between 1424 and 1449 and its estates were transferred to Ulrik Stygge, Bishop of Aarhus. After years of contention some of them were eventually made over to Voer Abbey in 1488.
