= Case hierarchy =

Theory in linguistic typology

In linguistic typology, the case hierarchy denotes an order of grammatical cases. If a language has a particular case, it also has all cases lower than this particular case. To put it another way, if a language lacks a particular case, it is also unlikely to develop cases higher than this particular case. This theory was developed by the Australian linguist Barry Blake. His theory was inspired by the approach of Italian linguist Guglielmo Cinque.

The hierarchy is as follows:

NOM / ABS < ACC / ERG < GEN < DAT < LOC < ABL / INS < others

This is only a general tendency, however. Many forms of Central German such as Colognian or Luxembourgish have a dative case but lack a genitive. In Irish nouns, the nominative and accusative have fallen together, while the dative case has remained separate in some paradigms; Irish also has a genitive and vocative case. In Punjabi, the accusative, genitive, and dative have merged to an oblique case, but the language still retains vocative, locative, and ablative cases. Old English had an instrumental case, but not a locative or prepositional.

Blake argues that it is "doubtful that the hierarchy can be extended much further", but does suggest that the most common cases not listed in the hierarchy are the comitative, purposive, allative, perlative and comparative.

== See also ==
- Differential object marking
