= Richard Vissing =

American politician

Richard L. Vissing

Mayor of Jeffersonville
- In office January 1, 1964 – December 31, 1983
- Preceded by: Charles Hoodenpyl
- Succeeded by: Dale Orem

Personal details
- Born: 1919
- Died: 1987 (aged 67–68) Jeffersonville, Indiana
- Party: Democratic

Richard Vissing (1915–1987) was mayor of Jeffersonville, Indiana. He served five terms from 1964 to 1983, making him one of the longest serving mayors in the state, and was the city's first full-time mayor. During his terms as mayor he was credited for helping revitalize the city, built the new city-county building and added parks to the city such as River City Park, now named Vissing Park in his honor. One of the notable accomplishments was the purchasing of original Jeffersonville's Ken Ellis Center (A Community Shelter) during the 1970s which was originally a tavern, in 2004 the original building was destroyed by a tornado.

Vissing was born Feb. 22, 1915 where he lived and died in, and for, Jeffersonville. His father, John, built Vissings Dodge (Studebaker, Renault, etc.) in 1928. The garage burned down the first time in 1949 and was rebuilt. The cause of that fire was started in the paint room. Rich was co-owner of the car establishment, and ran a wrecker service. He pulled in many cars during his days, with the most famous being that of John Dillinger. In 2006 the car dealership burned down again. Vissing also started Camper City in Jeffersonville and also built the Jeffersonvilla Motel.

He was married to Edna Elizabeth Bruner. They had two children, Jack Vissing and Yvonne Vissing, and four grandchildren. Jack is an attorney in Jeffersonville. Yvonne is a university professor, sociologist, and human rights scholar in New England.

== See also ==
- List of mayors of Jeffersonville, Indiana
