= Jeffersonville Ethics Commission =

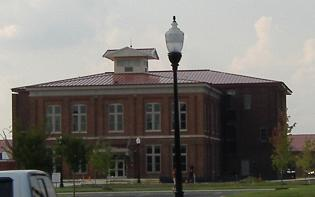
- Jeffersonville City Hall
- Formation: July 13, 2006
- Type: Municipal
- Headquarters: Jeffersonville City Hall
- Location: Jeffersonville, Indiana
- Members: Nominated by City Council
- President: Derek Spence
- Key people: Jim Berryman, Bruce Barkhauer, Ron Glass, Rachel Thrasher, Larry Wilder
- Staff: 6

The Jeffersonville Ethics Commission is a commission formed in 2006 by an ordinance compiled by the City Council of Jeffersonville, Indiana that was passed unanimously on June 30, 2006. Then it was signed by Mayor Rob Waiz on July 13, 2006. The Commission reviews complaints and subjects of interests in the financing and campaigning of political campaigns in the city of Jeffersonville. The basis for the local ordinance was a model document from the National League of Cities and campaign-finance codes from a variety of U.S. cities, including Chicago and San Antonio.

== Municipal campaign finance code ==
The Municipal Campaign Finance Code also known as the Jeffersonville Ethics Ordinance is what the Jeffersonville Ethics Commission use to enforce political campaigns. It is ordinance 2006-OR-36 in the city records and contains eighteen pages and seven articles. The ordinance introduces its intent and then goes into Article I of the ordinance giving definitions of terms used in the ordinance. Article II - Code of Conduct and explains things in fifteen sections from fiduciary duty all the way to prohibition of excepting donations from people with pending litigations against the city. Article III - Financial Disclosure refers to 94-OR-17 Section three of a previous ordinance regulating ethics for city officials and employees. Article IV - Board of Ethics which explains how members of the ethics commission are nominated to the position and how they will function and contains two sections. The composition of powers of the board and a Confidentiality clause. Article V - Sanctions for Violation contains three sections explaining the penalties and process of them. Article VI - Miscellaneous Provisions which covers severability. Article VII - Effective Date.

=== Amended version ===
The Municipal Campaign Finance Code would become amended with an ordinance numbering 2007-OR-56 in city records. In this amendment to the Municipal Campaign Finance Code it begins with an introduction, Article I definitions, and then into Article II Section 2.4 Receiving and Collecting Gifts and Favors. Section 2.4 restricts the context in which gifts or favors are given and what can be given. It also explains who can give gifts or favors and what amounts in certain situations can be given. Section 2.5 City Owned Property addressed that use of property of the city is for official use only and all uses must be authorized prior to usage by city officials or employees. Then Section 2.6 Use or Disclosure of Confidential Information explains that officials, candidates, and city employees shall not disclose confidential information other than what required by law, performing his or her official duties, and as permitted in section 2.13. The Municipal Finance Code continues explanations in conflicts of interest regulating business conducted with people like family members of an official, representations of other people regulating how officials and employees represent the city or other persons in situations, post employment restrictions regulating how business is conducted after leaving a job with the city or official position, interests in city business regulating the interaction of business conducted with officials or employees for contracts, services, or other work. After those sections this amendment addresses the employment of Relative in which input is prohibited in the decision process of hiring someone of relation to an official or employee of the city. The hiring of relatives has been controversial for several mayor administrations in the past. The amendment then continues with political activity regulating officials, candidates, or employees interactions with other officials or employees political interests. As well as the limitations thus far the amendment addresses a Whistleblower Protection clause for people making reports with the Ethics Commission as long as they aren't knowingly making a false report. The rest of the amendment clarifies limitations of contributions to elected officials and candidates and the prohibition of accepting donations from individuals, entities, or corporations that have pending litigation against the city. Article III is the Financial Disclosure referencing an old ordinance numbered 94-OR-17 in the city records. Article IV Board of Ethics regulates the composition and powers of the board and confidentiality. Article V Sanctions for Violations explains employment sanctions, fines, and validity of contract. Article VI Miscellaneous Provisions regulating severability. Article VIII Effective Date which was passed by the Council on November 5, 2007, and then signed by mayor Rob Waiz on November 9.

== Commission members ==
The Jeffersonville Ethics Commission members consist of five positions and a secretary to log the meetings.

- President: Derek Spence
- Member: Jim Berryman
- Member: Bruce Barkhauer
- Member: Ron Glass
- Secretary: Rachel Thrasher

The lawyer is the only paid position of the commission and doesn't get a vote

- Lawyer: Larry Wilder

== Members in elections ==
A point of concern has been adding to the law to include prohibiting members from being on the commission while actively pursuing an elected position. Elected officials are prohibited from being on the council. This was addressed in the amended law to prohibit candidates from participating.

- Derek Spence the President of the commission, ran for City Council but lost to Kevin Vissing and Nathan Samuel in the May 2007 Democratic Party Primary.
- Mike Hutt the former Vice-President of the council won the district 5 May 2007 Democratic Primary Election for City Council and would go on to lose to incumbent Republican Connie Sellers while still serving on the commission.
- Lonnie Cooper was the former commissions lawyer before he resigned because he was running for the City Court Judge. Lonnie Cooper lost the primary election in May 2007.
