= Klostermølle =

Watermill in Skanderborg, Denmark

Coordinates: 56°2′22″N 9°41′36″E

Klostermølle was originally a watermill, serving the now demolished Voer Abbey once situated nearby. The mill is located at the western end of lake Mossø.

In 1872, the monks' old mill — operated as a grain mill since the time of the Protestant Reformation — was converted to a sawmill. The wood waste also served as feedstock for a cardboard factory, driven by water power. The finished cardboard was shipped by steamboat across the lake to the railway station in Alken. Production continued until 1974, when some of the buildings were destroyed by fire; the long lumber drying shed was spared. The Danish Forest and Nature Agency has purchased the site as part of a program of nature conservation of the area surrounding Mossø and Vissing Abbey. Today, it is both a nature center and the headquarters for the Danish youth organization Nature and Youth (Natur & Ungdom).

Images of Klostermølle
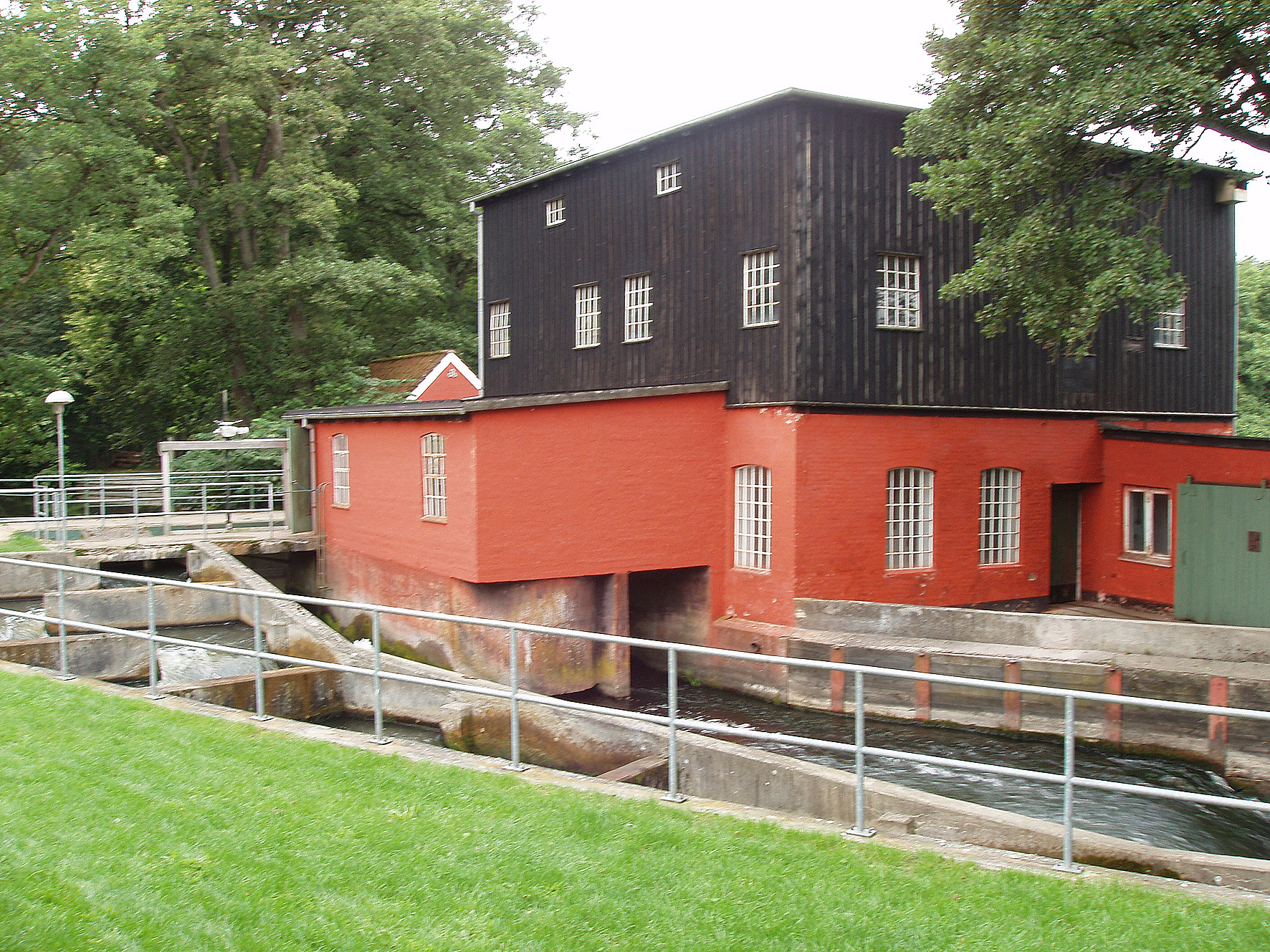
The turbine house at the watermill, where the sawmill was also located.

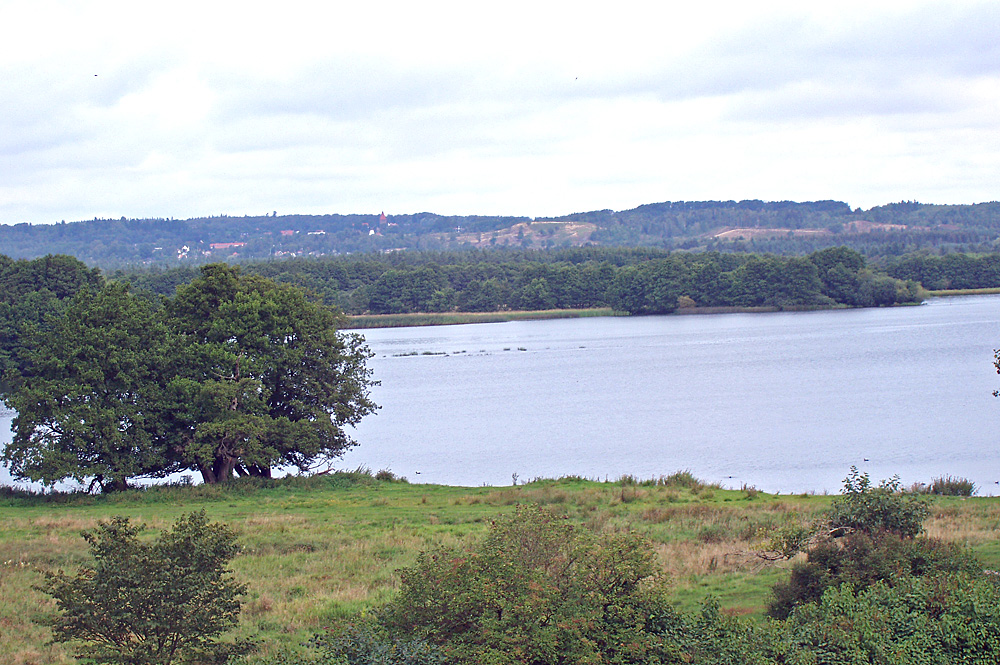
The lake of Mossø seen from the southwest at Klostermølle; in the distance is Gammel Rye.

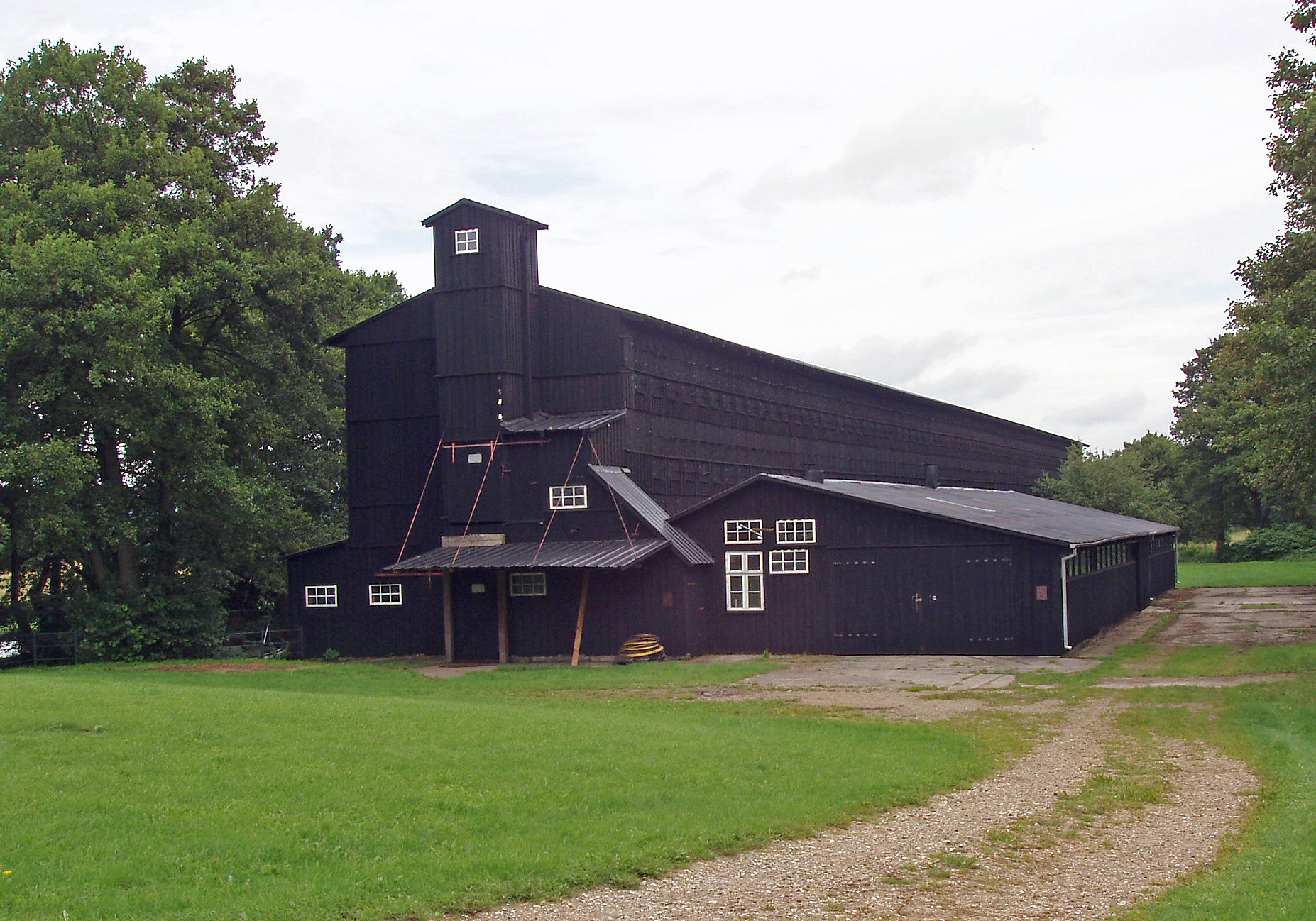
The drying barn, a remnant of Klostermølle's use as a sawmill.
