= Jollo =

Online machine translation service

Jollo was an online machine translation service where users could instantly translate texts into 23 languages, request human translations from a community of volunteers around the world, and compare the correctness of several leading machine translation websites. It was discontinued in 2012.

== System ==
Jollo was a free Web 2.0 website that attempted to improve the way in which people translate online through the use of existing machine translation websites and a community of volunteers who correct and rate translations. The system relied on a similar methodology as computer-assisted translation to ensure translation quality, and featured a public translation memory that records past translations.

Jollo received some notable media attention, including in The Daily Telegraph. According to the blog KillerStartups, Jollo combined the benefits of the speed of machine translations and human reviews to ensure translation quality. According to Jeffrey Hill from The English Blog, the community features made Jollo an interesting alternative to other online translation services.

== Development ==
The Jollo website was classified as beta. It was developed using LAMP and was praised for its colorful graphics and simple user interface.

Jollo offered a simple web-based API that could be used for translations. For example, the URL: http://www.jollo.com/translate.php?st=I%20love%20you&sl=en&tl=zh was used to translate the sentence "I love you" from English into Chinese.
