= Our Lady of Providence High School =

Location
- 707 Providence Way; Clarksville, Indiana 47129-1599; United States; 38°18′22″N 85°47′2″W

Information
- Type: Private, coeducational
- Religious affiliation: Roman Catholic
- Established: 1951
- President: Victor Beeler II
- Principal: Steve Beyl
- Teaching staff: 25.0 (on an FTE basis)
- Grades: 9–12
- Enrollment: 371 (2023–2024)
- Student to teacher ratio: 14.8
- Color
- Nickname: Pioneers
- Accreditation: North Central Association of Colleges and Schools
- Endowment: $1,878,399 (June 2019)
- Tuition: $13,450 - $15,255
- Website: www.providencehigh.net
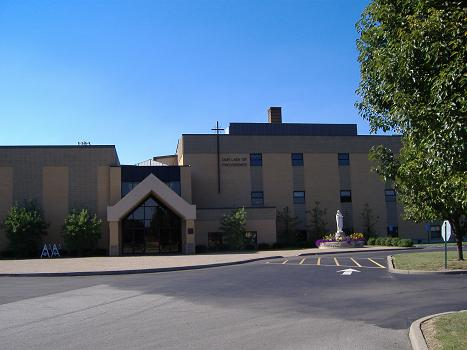

Our Lady of Providence High School is a co-ed, Catholic high school in Clarksville, Indiana, United States, in the Roman Catholic Archdiocese of Indianapolis. The school first opened on September 12, 1951.

Providence was recognized as a Blue Ribbon School of Excellence by the United States Department of Education in 2000. It receives accreditation from the Indiana Department of Education and the North Central Association of Colleges and Secondary Schools. It includes grades 9–12.

== Athletics ==
The Providence Pioneers are an independent school. The school colors are navy blue and white. The following IHSAA-sanctioned sports are offered:

- Baseball (boys)
  - State champion – 2016, 2021, 2024
- Basketball (girls & boys)
  - Boys' state champion – 2022
- Cross country (girls & boys)
- Football (boys)
  - State champion – 2024
- Golf (girls & boys)
- Soccer (girls & boys)
  - Girls' state champion – 2011
  - Boys' state champion – 2020
- Softball (girls
- Swimming & diving (girls & boys)
- Tennis (girls & boys)
- Track & field (girls & boys)
- Volleyball (girls)
  - State champion – 2013, 2014, 2015, 2022, 2023
- Wrestling (boys)

== See also ==
- List of high schools in Indiana
